

98001–98100 

|-bgcolor=#fefefe
| 98001 ||  || — || August 29, 2000 || Socorro || LINEAR || NYS || align=right | 1.2 km || 
|-id=002 bgcolor=#d6d6d6
| 98002 ||  || — || August 29, 2000 || Socorro || LINEAR || 3:2 || align=right | 12 km || 
|-id=003 bgcolor=#fefefe
| 98003 ||  || — || August 29, 2000 || Socorro || LINEAR || FLO || align=right | 1.7 km || 
|-id=004 bgcolor=#fefefe
| 98004 ||  || — || August 29, 2000 || Socorro || LINEAR || — || align=right | 1.7 km || 
|-id=005 bgcolor=#fefefe
| 98005 ||  || — || August 29, 2000 || Socorro || LINEAR || — || align=right | 1.6 km || 
|-id=006 bgcolor=#fefefe
| 98006 ||  || — || August 31, 2000 || Socorro || LINEAR || NYS || align=right | 1.4 km || 
|-id=007 bgcolor=#fefefe
| 98007 ||  || — || August 31, 2000 || Socorro || LINEAR || NYS || align=right | 3.2 km || 
|-id=008 bgcolor=#fefefe
| 98008 ||  || — || August 31, 2000 || Socorro || LINEAR || NYS || align=right | 1.3 km || 
|-id=009 bgcolor=#fefefe
| 98009 ||  || — || August 31, 2000 || Socorro || LINEAR || FLO || align=right | 1.3 km || 
|-id=010 bgcolor=#fefefe
| 98010 ||  || — || August 31, 2000 || Socorro || LINEAR || NYS || align=right | 1.2 km || 
|-id=011 bgcolor=#fefefe
| 98011 ||  || — || August 31, 2000 || Socorro || LINEAR || V || align=right | 1.3 km || 
|-id=012 bgcolor=#fefefe
| 98012 ||  || — || August 31, 2000 || Socorro || LINEAR || — || align=right | 1.7 km || 
|-id=013 bgcolor=#fefefe
| 98013 ||  || — || August 31, 2000 || Socorro || LINEAR || — || align=right | 5.2 km || 
|-id=014 bgcolor=#fefefe
| 98014 ||  || — || August 31, 2000 || Socorro || LINEAR || — || align=right | 1.7 km || 
|-id=015 bgcolor=#fefefe
| 98015 ||  || — || August 31, 2000 || Socorro || LINEAR || — || align=right | 1.6 km || 
|-id=016 bgcolor=#fefefe
| 98016 ||  || — || August 21, 2000 || Anderson Mesa || LONEOS || — || align=right | 1.8 km || 
|-id=017 bgcolor=#fefefe
| 98017 ||  || — || August 26, 2000 || Kitt Peak || Spacewatch || NYS || align=right | 4.1 km || 
|-id=018 bgcolor=#fefefe
| 98018 ||  || — || August 31, 2000 || Socorro || LINEAR || — || align=right | 2.2 km || 
|-id=019 bgcolor=#fefefe
| 98019 ||  || — || August 31, 2000 || Socorro || LINEAR || — || align=right | 2.1 km || 
|-id=020 bgcolor=#fefefe
| 98020 ||  || — || August 31, 2000 || Socorro || LINEAR || — || align=right | 2.9 km || 
|-id=021 bgcolor=#fefefe
| 98021 ||  || — || August 24, 2000 || Socorro || LINEAR || — || align=right | 1.8 km || 
|-id=022 bgcolor=#fefefe
| 98022 ||  || — || August 26, 2000 || Socorro || LINEAR || — || align=right | 1.6 km || 
|-id=023 bgcolor=#fefefe
| 98023 ||  || — || August 21, 2000 || Anderson Mesa || LONEOS || V || align=right | 1.4 km || 
|-id=024 bgcolor=#fefefe
| 98024 ||  || — || September 1, 2000 || Socorro || LINEAR || — || align=right | 4.3 km || 
|-id=025 bgcolor=#fefefe
| 98025 ||  || — || September 1, 2000 || Socorro || LINEAR || — || align=right | 2.0 km || 
|-id=026 bgcolor=#fefefe
| 98026 ||  || — || September 1, 2000 || Socorro || LINEAR || NYS || align=right | 1.6 km || 
|-id=027 bgcolor=#fefefe
| 98027 ||  || — || September 1, 2000 || Socorro || LINEAR || FLO || align=right | 1.1 km || 
|-id=028 bgcolor=#fefefe
| 98028 ||  || — || September 1, 2000 || Socorro || LINEAR || — || align=right | 1.9 km || 
|-id=029 bgcolor=#fefefe
| 98029 ||  || — || September 1, 2000 || Socorro || LINEAR || V || align=right | 1.4 km || 
|-id=030 bgcolor=#fefefe
| 98030 ||  || — || September 1, 2000 || Socorro || LINEAR || — || align=right | 4.0 km || 
|-id=031 bgcolor=#fefefe
| 98031 ||  || — || September 1, 2000 || Socorro || LINEAR || — || align=right | 2.6 km || 
|-id=032 bgcolor=#fefefe
| 98032 ||  || — || September 1, 2000 || Socorro || LINEAR || — || align=right | 2.9 km || 
|-id=033 bgcolor=#fefefe
| 98033 ||  || — || September 1, 2000 || Socorro || LINEAR || — || align=right | 1.8 km || 
|-id=034 bgcolor=#E9E9E9
| 98034 ||  || — || September 2, 2000 || Višnjan Observatory || K. Korlević || — || align=right | 2.2 km || 
|-id=035 bgcolor=#fefefe
| 98035 ||  || — || September 1, 2000 || Socorro || LINEAR || — || align=right | 1.3 km || 
|-id=036 bgcolor=#d6d6d6
| 98036 ||  || — || September 1, 2000 || Socorro || LINEAR || EOS || align=right | 4.4 km || 
|-id=037 bgcolor=#C2FFFF
| 98037 ||  || — || September 1, 2000 || Socorro || LINEAR || L5 || align=right | 13 km || 
|-id=038 bgcolor=#fefefe
| 98038 ||  || — || September 1, 2000 || Socorro || LINEAR || V || align=right | 1.9 km || 
|-id=039 bgcolor=#FA8072
| 98039 ||  || — || September 1, 2000 || Socorro || LINEAR || PHO || align=right | 2.7 km || 
|-id=040 bgcolor=#fefefe
| 98040 ||  || — || September 1, 2000 || Socorro || LINEAR || — || align=right | 3.3 km || 
|-id=041 bgcolor=#fefefe
| 98041 ||  || — || September 1, 2000 || Socorro || LINEAR || V || align=right | 1.8 km || 
|-id=042 bgcolor=#fefefe
| 98042 ||  || — || September 1, 2000 || Socorro || LINEAR || — || align=right | 3.1 km || 
|-id=043 bgcolor=#fefefe
| 98043 ||  || — || September 1, 2000 || Socorro || LINEAR || V || align=right | 1.4 km || 
|-id=044 bgcolor=#fefefe
| 98044 ||  || — || September 1, 2000 || Socorro || LINEAR || — || align=right | 2.1 km || 
|-id=045 bgcolor=#fefefe
| 98045 ||  || — || September 1, 2000 || Socorro || LINEAR || — || align=right | 1.6 km || 
|-id=046 bgcolor=#fefefe
| 98046 ||  || — || September 1, 2000 || Socorro || LINEAR || V || align=right | 2.7 km || 
|-id=047 bgcolor=#E9E9E9
| 98047 ||  || — || September 1, 2000 || Socorro || LINEAR || — || align=right | 2.2 km || 
|-id=048 bgcolor=#fefefe
| 98048 ||  || — || September 1, 2000 || Socorro || LINEAR || V || align=right | 1.6 km || 
|-id=049 bgcolor=#fefefe
| 98049 ||  || — || September 1, 2000 || Socorro || LINEAR || V || align=right | 1.6 km || 
|-id=050 bgcolor=#fefefe
| 98050 ||  || — || September 1, 2000 || Socorro || LINEAR || — || align=right | 2.5 km || 
|-id=051 bgcolor=#fefefe
| 98051 ||  || — || September 1, 2000 || Socorro || LINEAR || V || align=right | 1.3 km || 
|-id=052 bgcolor=#fefefe
| 98052 ||  || — || September 1, 2000 || Socorro || LINEAR || V || align=right | 1.4 km || 
|-id=053 bgcolor=#fefefe
| 98053 ||  || — || September 2, 2000 || Socorro || LINEAR || — || align=right | 2.0 km || 
|-id=054 bgcolor=#fefefe
| 98054 ||  || — || September 2, 2000 || Socorro || LINEAR || — || align=right | 1.7 km || 
|-id=055 bgcolor=#fefefe
| 98055 ||  || — || September 2, 2000 || Socorro || LINEAR || slow || align=right | 2.3 km || 
|-id=056 bgcolor=#fefefe
| 98056 ||  || — || September 3, 2000 || Socorro || LINEAR || — || align=right | 4.2 km || 
|-id=057 bgcolor=#fefefe
| 98057 ||  || — || September 3, 2000 || Socorro || LINEAR || V || align=right | 1.8 km || 
|-id=058 bgcolor=#fefefe
| 98058 ||  || — || September 3, 2000 || Socorro || LINEAR || FLO || align=right | 2.4 km || 
|-id=059 bgcolor=#fefefe
| 98059 ||  || — || September 3, 2000 || Socorro || LINEAR || — || align=right | 1.6 km || 
|-id=060 bgcolor=#fefefe
| 98060 ||  || — || September 3, 2000 || Socorro || LINEAR || — || align=right | 2.4 km || 
|-id=061 bgcolor=#fefefe
| 98061 ||  || — || September 3, 2000 || Socorro || LINEAR || — || align=right | 4.4 km || 
|-id=062 bgcolor=#fefefe
| 98062 ||  || — || September 3, 2000 || Socorro || LINEAR || — || align=right | 1.4 km || 
|-id=063 bgcolor=#fefefe
| 98063 ||  || — || September 3, 2000 || Socorro || LINEAR || slow? || align=right | 2.2 km || 
|-id=064 bgcolor=#fefefe
| 98064 ||  || — || September 3, 2000 || Socorro || LINEAR || — || align=right | 2.3 km || 
|-id=065 bgcolor=#fefefe
| 98065 ||  || — || September 5, 2000 || Socorro || LINEAR || FLO || align=right | 1.6 km || 
|-id=066 bgcolor=#fefefe
| 98066 ||  || — || September 5, 2000 || Socorro || LINEAR || — || align=right | 2.9 km || 
|-id=067 bgcolor=#E9E9E9
| 98067 ||  || — || September 1, 2000 || Socorro || LINEAR || — || align=right | 2.7 km || 
|-id=068 bgcolor=#fefefe
| 98068 ||  || — || September 4, 2000 || Socorro || LINEAR || NYS || align=right | 1.6 km || 
|-id=069 bgcolor=#E9E9E9
| 98069 ||  || — || September 4, 2000 || Socorro || LINEAR || — || align=right | 1.8 km || 
|-id=070 bgcolor=#fefefe
| 98070 ||  || — || September 5, 2000 || Prescott || P. G. Comba || NYS || align=right | 1.5 km || 
|-id=071 bgcolor=#fefefe
| 98071 ||  || — || September 3, 2000 || Socorro || LINEAR || — || align=right | 2.7 km || 
|-id=072 bgcolor=#fefefe
| 98072 ||  || — || September 5, 2000 || Socorro || LINEAR || V || align=right | 1.5 km || 
|-id=073 bgcolor=#fefefe
| 98073 ||  || — || September 6, 2000 || Socorro || LINEAR || — || align=right | 2.4 km || 
|-id=074 bgcolor=#fefefe
| 98074 ||  || — || September 7, 2000 || Kleť || Kleť Obs. || V || align=right | 1.5 km || 
|-id=075 bgcolor=#fefefe
| 98075 ||  || — || September 2, 2000 || Socorro || LINEAR || FLO || align=right | 2.5 km || 
|-id=076 bgcolor=#fefefe
| 98076 ||  || — || September 3, 2000 || Socorro || LINEAR || — || align=right | 2.4 km || 
|-id=077 bgcolor=#fefefe
| 98077 ||  || — || September 1, 2000 || Socorro || LINEAR || V || align=right | 1.5 km || 
|-id=078 bgcolor=#fefefe
| 98078 ||  || — || September 1, 2000 || Socorro || LINEAR || — || align=right | 2.3 km || 
|-id=079 bgcolor=#fefefe
| 98079 ||  || — || September 1, 2000 || Socorro || LINEAR || NYS || align=right | 1.5 km || 
|-id=080 bgcolor=#fefefe
| 98080 ||  || — || September 1, 2000 || Socorro || LINEAR || — || align=right | 1.7 km || 
|-id=081 bgcolor=#E9E9E9
| 98081 ||  || — || September 1, 2000 || Socorro || LINEAR || MARslow || align=right | 2.9 km || 
|-id=082 bgcolor=#fefefe
| 98082 ||  || — || September 1, 2000 || Socorro || LINEAR || FLO || align=right | 1.8 km || 
|-id=083 bgcolor=#fefefe
| 98083 ||  || — || September 2, 2000 || Socorro || LINEAR || — || align=right | 2.1 km || 
|-id=084 bgcolor=#fefefe
| 98084 ||  || — || September 2, 2000 || Socorro || LINEAR || MAS || align=right | 1.5 km || 
|-id=085 bgcolor=#fefefe
| 98085 ||  || — || September 2, 2000 || Socorro || LINEAR || — || align=right | 2.0 km || 
|-id=086 bgcolor=#fefefe
| 98086 ||  || — || September 2, 2000 || Socorro || LINEAR || V || align=right | 2.2 km || 
|-id=087 bgcolor=#fefefe
| 98087 ||  || — || September 2, 2000 || Socorro || LINEAR || — || align=right | 4.5 km || 
|-id=088 bgcolor=#fefefe
| 98088 ||  || — || September 2, 2000 || Socorro || LINEAR || — || align=right | 2.0 km || 
|-id=089 bgcolor=#fefefe
| 98089 ||  || — || September 2, 2000 || Socorro || LINEAR || — || align=right | 2.0 km || 
|-id=090 bgcolor=#fefefe
| 98090 ||  || — || September 2, 2000 || Socorro || LINEAR || — || align=right | 1.6 km || 
|-id=091 bgcolor=#fefefe
| 98091 ||  || — || September 2, 2000 || Socorro || LINEAR || — || align=right | 1.5 km || 
|-id=092 bgcolor=#E9E9E9
| 98092 ||  || — || September 2, 2000 || Socorro || LINEAR || — || align=right | 1.8 km || 
|-id=093 bgcolor=#fefefe
| 98093 ||  || — || September 2, 2000 || Socorro || LINEAR || NYS || align=right | 1.6 km || 
|-id=094 bgcolor=#fefefe
| 98094 ||  || — || September 7, 2000 || Elmira || A. J. Cecce || — || align=right | 2.1 km || 
|-id=095 bgcolor=#fefefe
| 98095 ||  || — || September 8, 2000 || Ondřejov || L. Kotková || NYS || align=right | 1.4 km || 
|-id=096 bgcolor=#fefefe
| 98096 ||  || — || September 8, 2000 || Ondřejov || L. Kotková || — || align=right | 1.6 km || 
|-id=097 bgcolor=#fefefe
| 98097 ||  || — || September 2, 2000 || Anderson Mesa || LONEOS || V || align=right | 1.3 km || 
|-id=098 bgcolor=#fefefe
| 98098 ||  || — || September 1, 2000 || Socorro || LINEAR || — || align=right | 2.2 km || 
|-id=099 bgcolor=#fefefe
| 98099 ||  || — || September 1, 2000 || Socorro || LINEAR || PHO || align=right | 3.1 km || 
|-id=100 bgcolor=#fefefe
| 98100 ||  || — || September 1, 2000 || Socorro || LINEAR || — || align=right | 1.8 km || 
|}

98101–98200 

|-bgcolor=#fefefe
| 98101 ||  || — || September 2, 2000 || Anderson Mesa || LONEOS || V || align=right | 1.3 km || 
|-id=102 bgcolor=#E9E9E9
| 98102 ||  || — || September 2, 2000 || Anderson Mesa || LONEOS || — || align=right | 4.5 km || 
|-id=103 bgcolor=#fefefe
| 98103 ||  || — || September 2, 2000 || Anderson Mesa || LONEOS || V || align=right | 1.5 km || 
|-id=104 bgcolor=#fefefe
| 98104 ||  || — || September 2, 2000 || Anderson Mesa || LONEOS || — || align=right | 1.7 km || 
|-id=105 bgcolor=#fefefe
| 98105 ||  || — || September 3, 2000 || Socorro || LINEAR || FLO || align=right | 1.5 km || 
|-id=106 bgcolor=#fefefe
| 98106 ||  || — || September 3, 2000 || Socorro || LINEAR || V || align=right | 1.6 km || 
|-id=107 bgcolor=#fefefe
| 98107 ||  || — || September 3, 2000 || Socorro || LINEAR || — || align=right | 2.1 km || 
|-id=108 bgcolor=#fefefe
| 98108 ||  || — || September 3, 2000 || Socorro || LINEAR || NYS || align=right | 1.5 km || 
|-id=109 bgcolor=#fefefe
| 98109 ||  || — || September 3, 2000 || Socorro || LINEAR || V || align=right | 1.4 km || 
|-id=110 bgcolor=#fefefe
| 98110 ||  || — || September 3, 2000 || Socorro || LINEAR || — || align=right | 1.6 km || 
|-id=111 bgcolor=#fefefe
| 98111 ||  || — || September 4, 2000 || Anderson Mesa || LONEOS || NYS || align=right | 1.4 km || 
|-id=112 bgcolor=#fefefe
| 98112 ||  || — || September 4, 2000 || Anderson Mesa || LONEOS || — || align=right | 1.6 km || 
|-id=113 bgcolor=#fefefe
| 98113 ||  || — || September 4, 2000 || Anderson Mesa || LONEOS || V || align=right | 2.1 km || 
|-id=114 bgcolor=#E9E9E9
| 98114 ||  || — || September 4, 2000 || Anderson Mesa || LONEOS || — || align=right | 2.0 km || 
|-id=115 bgcolor=#fefefe
| 98115 ||  || — || September 5, 2000 || Anderson Mesa || LONEOS || — || align=right | 1.7 km || 
|-id=116 bgcolor=#C2FFFF
| 98116 ||  || — || September 5, 2000 || Anderson Mesa || LONEOS || L5 || align=right | 20 km || 
|-id=117 bgcolor=#FA8072
| 98117 ||  || — || September 20, 2000 || Socorro || LINEAR || — || align=right | 2.2 km || 
|-id=118 bgcolor=#fefefe
| 98118 ||  || — || September 20, 2000 || Socorro || LINEAR || — || align=right | 1.5 km || 
|-id=119 bgcolor=#fefefe
| 98119 ||  || — || September 21, 2000 || Socorro || LINEAR || — || align=right | 2.0 km || 
|-id=120 bgcolor=#fefefe
| 98120 ||  || — || September 22, 2000 || Višnjan Observatory || K. Korlević, M. Jurić || V || align=right | 1.6 km || 
|-id=121 bgcolor=#fefefe
| 98121 ||  || — || September 20, 2000 || Socorro || LINEAR || PHO || align=right | 2.4 km || 
|-id=122 bgcolor=#fefefe
| 98122 ||  || — || September 20, 2000 || Socorro || LINEAR || FLO || align=right | 2.1 km || 
|-id=123 bgcolor=#fefefe
| 98123 ||  || — || September 23, 2000 || Socorro || LINEAR || FLO || align=right | 1.9 km || 
|-id=124 bgcolor=#fefefe
| 98124 ||  || — || September 23, 2000 || Socorro || LINEAR || FLO || align=right | 1.4 km || 
|-id=125 bgcolor=#fefefe
| 98125 ||  || — || September 24, 2000 || Bisei SG Center || BATTeRS || — || align=right | 1.9 km || 
|-id=126 bgcolor=#fefefe
| 98126 ||  || — || September 26, 2000 || Višnjan Observatory || K. Korlević || — || align=right | 2.7 km || 
|-id=127 bgcolor=#fefefe
| 98127 Vilgusová ||  ||  || September 24, 2000 || Ondřejov || L. Kotková, P. Pravec || — || align=right | 1.7 km || 
|-id=128 bgcolor=#fefefe
| 98128 ||  || — || September 26, 2000 || Bisei SG Center || BATTeRS || V || align=right | 2.1 km || 
|-id=129 bgcolor=#FA8072
| 98129 ||  || — || September 22, 2000 || Socorro || LINEAR || — || align=right | 3.7 km || 
|-id=130 bgcolor=#fefefe
| 98130 ||  || — || September 23, 2000 || Socorro || LINEAR || V || align=right | 1.6 km || 
|-id=131 bgcolor=#fefefe
| 98131 ||  || — || September 24, 2000 || Socorro || LINEAR || NYS || align=right | 1.4 km || 
|-id=132 bgcolor=#fefefe
| 98132 ||  || — || September 24, 2000 || Socorro || LINEAR || FLO || align=right | 1.3 km || 
|-id=133 bgcolor=#fefefe
| 98133 ||  || — || September 24, 2000 || Socorro || LINEAR || — || align=right | 1.6 km || 
|-id=134 bgcolor=#fefefe
| 98134 ||  || — || September 24, 2000 || Socorro || LINEAR || FLO || align=right | 1.8 km || 
|-id=135 bgcolor=#fefefe
| 98135 ||  || — || September 24, 2000 || Socorro || LINEAR || V || align=right | 1.6 km || 
|-id=136 bgcolor=#fefefe
| 98136 ||  || — || September 24, 2000 || Socorro || LINEAR || FLO || align=right | 1.6 km || 
|-id=137 bgcolor=#fefefe
| 98137 ||  || — || September 24, 2000 || Socorro || LINEAR || — || align=right | 1.5 km || 
|-id=138 bgcolor=#fefefe
| 98138 ||  || — || September 25, 2000 || Črni Vrh || Črni Vrh || — || align=right | 1.9 km || 
|-id=139 bgcolor=#C2FFFF
| 98139 ||  || — || September 24, 2000 || Socorro || LINEAR || L5 || align=right | 14 km || 
|-id=140 bgcolor=#fefefe
| 98140 ||  || — || September 24, 2000 || Socorro || LINEAR || NYS || align=right | 1.2 km || 
|-id=141 bgcolor=#fefefe
| 98141 ||  || — || September 24, 2000 || Socorro || LINEAR || MAS || align=right | 1.4 km || 
|-id=142 bgcolor=#fefefe
| 98142 ||  || — || September 24, 2000 || Socorro || LINEAR || NYS || align=right | 1.5 km || 
|-id=143 bgcolor=#C2FFFF
| 98143 ||  || — || September 24, 2000 || Socorro || LINEAR || L5 || align=right | 18 km || 
|-id=144 bgcolor=#fefefe
| 98144 ||  || — || September 24, 2000 || Socorro || LINEAR || NYS || align=right | 2.8 km || 
|-id=145 bgcolor=#fefefe
| 98145 ||  || — || September 24, 2000 || Socorro || LINEAR || NYS || align=right | 1.5 km || 
|-id=146 bgcolor=#fefefe
| 98146 ||  || — || September 24, 2000 || Socorro || LINEAR || MAS || align=right | 2.1 km || 
|-id=147 bgcolor=#fefefe
| 98147 ||  || — || September 24, 2000 || Socorro || LINEAR || — || align=right | 2.2 km || 
|-id=148 bgcolor=#fefefe
| 98148 ||  || — || September 24, 2000 || Socorro || LINEAR || FLO || align=right | 1.4 km || 
|-id=149 bgcolor=#fefefe
| 98149 ||  || — || September 24, 2000 || Socorro || LINEAR || NYS || align=right | 3.5 km || 
|-id=150 bgcolor=#fefefe
| 98150 ||  || — || September 24, 2000 || Socorro || LINEAR || fast? || align=right | 1.4 km || 
|-id=151 bgcolor=#fefefe
| 98151 ||  || — || September 24, 2000 || Socorro || LINEAR || NYS || align=right | 1.5 km || 
|-id=152 bgcolor=#fefefe
| 98152 ||  || — || September 24, 2000 || Socorro || LINEAR || — || align=right | 1.6 km || 
|-id=153 bgcolor=#C2FFFF
| 98153 ||  || — || September 24, 2000 || Socorro || LINEAR || L5 || align=right | 21 km || 
|-id=154 bgcolor=#fefefe
| 98154 ||  || — || September 24, 2000 || Socorro || LINEAR || FLO || align=right | 1.7 km || 
|-id=155 bgcolor=#fefefe
| 98155 ||  || — || September 24, 2000 || Socorro || LINEAR || V || align=right | 1.5 km || 
|-id=156 bgcolor=#fefefe
| 98156 ||  || — || September 24, 2000 || Socorro || LINEAR || — || align=right | 2.7 km || 
|-id=157 bgcolor=#E9E9E9
| 98157 ||  || — || September 24, 2000 || Socorro || LINEAR || — || align=right | 2.5 km || 
|-id=158 bgcolor=#fefefe
| 98158 ||  || — || September 24, 2000 || Socorro || LINEAR || FLO || align=right | 2.3 km || 
|-id=159 bgcolor=#fefefe
| 98159 ||  || — || September 24, 2000 || Socorro || LINEAR || FLO || align=right | 1.5 km || 
|-id=160 bgcolor=#fefefe
| 98160 ||  || — || September 24, 2000 || Socorro || LINEAR || — || align=right | 1.5 km || 
|-id=161 bgcolor=#fefefe
| 98161 ||  || — || September 24, 2000 || Socorro || LINEAR || NYS || align=right | 1.5 km || 
|-id=162 bgcolor=#fefefe
| 98162 ||  || — || September 24, 2000 || Socorro || LINEAR || — || align=right | 1.8 km || 
|-id=163 bgcolor=#fefefe
| 98163 ||  || — || September 24, 2000 || Socorro || LINEAR || V || align=right | 1.5 km || 
|-id=164 bgcolor=#fefefe
| 98164 ||  || — || September 24, 2000 || Socorro || LINEAR || V || align=right | 1.5 km || 
|-id=165 bgcolor=#fefefe
| 98165 ||  || — || September 24, 2000 || Socorro || LINEAR || NYS || align=right | 1.3 km || 
|-id=166 bgcolor=#fefefe
| 98166 ||  || — || September 24, 2000 || Socorro || LINEAR || V || align=right | 1.4 km || 
|-id=167 bgcolor=#fefefe
| 98167 ||  || — || September 24, 2000 || Socorro || LINEAR || V || align=right | 1.9 km || 
|-id=168 bgcolor=#fefefe
| 98168 ||  || — || September 24, 2000 || Socorro || LINEAR || FLO || align=right | 3.0 km || 
|-id=169 bgcolor=#fefefe
| 98169 ||  || — || September 24, 2000 || Socorro || LINEAR || — || align=right | 1.9 km || 
|-id=170 bgcolor=#fefefe
| 98170 ||  || — || September 24, 2000 || Socorro || LINEAR || ERI || align=right | 3.0 km || 
|-id=171 bgcolor=#fefefe
| 98171 ||  || — || September 24, 2000 || Socorro || LINEAR || KLI || align=right | 7.9 km || 
|-id=172 bgcolor=#fefefe
| 98172 ||  || — || September 23, 2000 || Socorro || LINEAR || — || align=right | 3.9 km || 
|-id=173 bgcolor=#fefefe
| 98173 ||  || — || September 23, 2000 || Socorro || LINEAR || — || align=right | 2.1 km || 
|-id=174 bgcolor=#fefefe
| 98174 ||  || — || September 23, 2000 || Socorro || LINEAR || — || align=right | 3.1 km || 
|-id=175 bgcolor=#fefefe
| 98175 ||  || — || September 23, 2000 || Socorro || LINEAR || V || align=right | 1.3 km || 
|-id=176 bgcolor=#fefefe
| 98176 ||  || — || September 23, 2000 || Socorro || LINEAR || — || align=right | 1.6 km || 
|-id=177 bgcolor=#fefefe
| 98177 ||  || — || September 23, 2000 || Socorro || LINEAR || — || align=right | 1.7 km || 
|-id=178 bgcolor=#fefefe
| 98178 ||  || — || September 23, 2000 || Socorro || LINEAR || CLA || align=right | 4.3 km || 
|-id=179 bgcolor=#fefefe
| 98179 ||  || — || September 23, 2000 || Socorro || LINEAR || NYS || align=right | 3.5 km || 
|-id=180 bgcolor=#fefefe
| 98180 ||  || — || September 24, 2000 || Socorro || LINEAR || NYS || align=right | 1.2 km || 
|-id=181 bgcolor=#fefefe
| 98181 ||  || — || September 24, 2000 || Socorro || LINEAR || V || align=right | 1.8 km || 
|-id=182 bgcolor=#fefefe
| 98182 ||  || — || September 24, 2000 || Socorro || LINEAR || — || align=right | 1.4 km || 
|-id=183 bgcolor=#fefefe
| 98183 ||  || — || September 24, 2000 || Socorro || LINEAR || MAS || align=right | 3.8 km || 
|-id=184 bgcolor=#fefefe
| 98184 ||  || — || September 24, 2000 || Socorro || LINEAR || — || align=right | 2.1 km || 
|-id=185 bgcolor=#fefefe
| 98185 ||  || — || September 24, 2000 || Socorro || LINEAR || — || align=right | 1.4 km || 
|-id=186 bgcolor=#fefefe
| 98186 ||  || — || September 24, 2000 || Socorro || LINEAR || — || align=right | 4.1 km || 
|-id=187 bgcolor=#fefefe
| 98187 ||  || — || September 24, 2000 || Socorro || LINEAR || — || align=right | 1.4 km || 
|-id=188 bgcolor=#fefefe
| 98188 ||  || — || September 24, 2000 || Socorro || LINEAR || NYS || align=right | 1.2 km || 
|-id=189 bgcolor=#fefefe
| 98189 ||  || — || September 24, 2000 || Socorro || LINEAR || MAS || align=right | 1.7 km || 
|-id=190 bgcolor=#fefefe
| 98190 ||  || — || September 24, 2000 || Socorro || LINEAR || V || align=right | 1.3 km || 
|-id=191 bgcolor=#fefefe
| 98191 ||  || — || September 24, 2000 || Socorro || LINEAR || NYS || align=right | 1.4 km || 
|-id=192 bgcolor=#fefefe
| 98192 ||  || — || September 24, 2000 || Socorro || LINEAR || MAS || align=right | 1.7 km || 
|-id=193 bgcolor=#fefefe
| 98193 ||  || — || September 24, 2000 || Socorro || LINEAR || — || align=right | 2.7 km || 
|-id=194 bgcolor=#fefefe
| 98194 ||  || — || September 24, 2000 || Socorro || LINEAR || — || align=right | 1.3 km || 
|-id=195 bgcolor=#fefefe
| 98195 ||  || — || September 24, 2000 || Socorro || LINEAR || — || align=right | 1.6 km || 
|-id=196 bgcolor=#fefefe
| 98196 ||  || — || September 24, 2000 || Socorro || LINEAR || NYS || align=right | 1.4 km || 
|-id=197 bgcolor=#fefefe
| 98197 ||  || — || September 24, 2000 || Socorro || LINEAR || NYS || align=right | 2.1 km || 
|-id=198 bgcolor=#fefefe
| 98198 ||  || — || September 24, 2000 || Socorro || LINEAR || FLO || align=right | 2.1 km || 
|-id=199 bgcolor=#fefefe
| 98199 ||  || — || September 24, 2000 || Socorro || LINEAR || — || align=right | 2.1 km || 
|-id=200 bgcolor=#fefefe
| 98200 ||  || — || September 24, 2000 || Socorro || LINEAR || FLO || align=right | 3.8 km || 
|}

98201–98300 

|-bgcolor=#fefefe
| 98201 ||  || — || September 24, 2000 || Socorro || LINEAR || FLO || align=right | 2.9 km || 
|-id=202 bgcolor=#fefefe
| 98202 ||  || — || September 24, 2000 || Socorro || LINEAR || NYS || align=right | 1.9 km || 
|-id=203 bgcolor=#fefefe
| 98203 ||  || — || September 24, 2000 || Socorro || LINEAR || — || align=right | 2.7 km || 
|-id=204 bgcolor=#fefefe
| 98204 ||  || — || September 24, 2000 || Socorro || LINEAR || — || align=right | 2.9 km || 
|-id=205 bgcolor=#fefefe
| 98205 ||  || — || September 24, 2000 || Socorro || LINEAR || V || align=right | 2.5 km || 
|-id=206 bgcolor=#fefefe
| 98206 ||  || — || September 24, 2000 || Socorro || LINEAR || — || align=right | 2.7 km || 
|-id=207 bgcolor=#fefefe
| 98207 ||  || — || September 24, 2000 || Socorro || LINEAR || NYS || align=right | 1.8 km || 
|-id=208 bgcolor=#fefefe
| 98208 ||  || — || September 24, 2000 || Socorro || LINEAR || MAS || align=right | 2.7 km || 
|-id=209 bgcolor=#E9E9E9
| 98209 ||  || — || September 22, 2000 || Socorro || LINEAR || — || align=right | 3.8 km || 
|-id=210 bgcolor=#fefefe
| 98210 ||  || — || September 23, 2000 || Socorro || LINEAR || — || align=right | 2.1 km || 
|-id=211 bgcolor=#fefefe
| 98211 ||  || — || September 23, 2000 || Socorro || LINEAR || V || align=right | 1.6 km || 
|-id=212 bgcolor=#fefefe
| 98212 ||  || — || September 23, 2000 || Socorro || LINEAR || FLO || align=right | 3.0 km || 
|-id=213 bgcolor=#fefefe
| 98213 ||  || — || September 23, 2000 || Socorro || LINEAR || — || align=right | 1.7 km || 
|-id=214 bgcolor=#fefefe
| 98214 ||  || — || September 23, 2000 || Socorro || LINEAR || — || align=right | 1.8 km || 
|-id=215 bgcolor=#fefefe
| 98215 ||  || — || September 23, 2000 || Socorro || LINEAR || — || align=right | 1.5 km || 
|-id=216 bgcolor=#fefefe
| 98216 ||  || — || September 23, 2000 || Socorro || LINEAR || FLO || align=right | 1.6 km || 
|-id=217 bgcolor=#fefefe
| 98217 ||  || — || September 23, 2000 || Socorro || LINEAR || FLO || align=right | 1.5 km || 
|-id=218 bgcolor=#fefefe
| 98218 ||  || — || September 23, 2000 || Socorro || LINEAR || V || align=right | 1.9 km || 
|-id=219 bgcolor=#fefefe
| 98219 ||  || — || September 23, 2000 || Socorro || LINEAR || V || align=right | 1.6 km || 
|-id=220 bgcolor=#fefefe
| 98220 ||  || — || September 23, 2000 || Socorro || LINEAR || FLO || align=right | 1.6 km || 
|-id=221 bgcolor=#E9E9E9
| 98221 ||  || — || September 23, 2000 || Socorro || LINEAR || — || align=right | 6.2 km || 
|-id=222 bgcolor=#fefefe
| 98222 ||  || — || September 24, 2000 || Socorro || LINEAR || FLO || align=right | 1.3 km || 
|-id=223 bgcolor=#fefefe
| 98223 ||  || — || September 24, 2000 || Socorro || LINEAR || NYS || align=right | 1.8 km || 
|-id=224 bgcolor=#fefefe
| 98224 ||  || — || September 24, 2000 || Socorro || LINEAR || — || align=right | 1.4 km || 
|-id=225 bgcolor=#fefefe
| 98225 ||  || — || September 24, 2000 || Socorro || LINEAR || — || align=right | 2.1 km || 
|-id=226 bgcolor=#fefefe
| 98226 ||  || — || September 24, 2000 || Socorro || LINEAR || NYS || align=right | 1.3 km || 
|-id=227 bgcolor=#fefefe
| 98227 ||  || — || September 24, 2000 || Socorro || LINEAR || — || align=right | 1.8 km || 
|-id=228 bgcolor=#fefefe
| 98228 ||  || — || September 24, 2000 || Socorro || LINEAR || — || align=right | 1.5 km || 
|-id=229 bgcolor=#fefefe
| 98229 ||  || — || September 24, 2000 || Socorro || LINEAR || MAS || align=right | 1.5 km || 
|-id=230 bgcolor=#fefefe
| 98230 ||  || — || September 24, 2000 || Socorro || LINEAR || NYS || align=right | 1.3 km || 
|-id=231 bgcolor=#fefefe
| 98231 ||  || — || September 24, 2000 || Socorro || LINEAR || — || align=right | 2.2 km || 
|-id=232 bgcolor=#fefefe
| 98232 ||  || — || September 24, 2000 || Socorro || LINEAR || FLO || align=right | 2.9 km || 
|-id=233 bgcolor=#E9E9E9
| 98233 ||  || — || September 24, 2000 || Socorro || LINEAR || — || align=right | 2.5 km || 
|-id=234 bgcolor=#fefefe
| 98234 ||  || — || September 24, 2000 || Socorro || LINEAR || FLO || align=right | 1.9 km || 
|-id=235 bgcolor=#E9E9E9
| 98235 ||  || — || September 24, 2000 || Socorro || LINEAR || — || align=right | 2.5 km || 
|-id=236 bgcolor=#fefefe
| 98236 ||  || — || September 24, 2000 || Socorro || LINEAR || — || align=right | 1.3 km || 
|-id=237 bgcolor=#fefefe
| 98237 ||  || — || September 24, 2000 || Socorro || LINEAR || V || align=right | 1.4 km || 
|-id=238 bgcolor=#fefefe
| 98238 ||  || — || September 24, 2000 || Socorro || LINEAR || — || align=right | 3.5 km || 
|-id=239 bgcolor=#fefefe
| 98239 ||  || — || September 24, 2000 || Socorro || LINEAR || — || align=right | 2.4 km || 
|-id=240 bgcolor=#fefefe
| 98240 ||  || — || September 27, 2000 || Socorro || LINEAR || V || align=right | 2.1 km || 
|-id=241 bgcolor=#fefefe
| 98241 ||  || — || September 27, 2000 || Socorro || LINEAR || — || align=right | 1.5 km || 
|-id=242 bgcolor=#fefefe
| 98242 ||  || — || September 30, 2000 || Elmira || A. J. Cecce || FLO || align=right | 1.6 km || 
|-id=243 bgcolor=#fefefe
| 98243 ||  || — || September 23, 2000 || Socorro || LINEAR || — || align=right | 2.2 km || 
|-id=244 bgcolor=#fefefe
| 98244 ||  || — || September 23, 2000 || Socorro || LINEAR || V || align=right | 1.3 km || 
|-id=245 bgcolor=#fefefe
| 98245 ||  || — || September 23, 2000 || Socorro || LINEAR || FLO || align=right | 1.7 km || 
|-id=246 bgcolor=#fefefe
| 98246 ||  || — || September 23, 2000 || Socorro || LINEAR || CIM || align=right | 4.3 km || 
|-id=247 bgcolor=#fefefe
| 98247 ||  || — || September 23, 2000 || Socorro || LINEAR || — || align=right | 2.7 km || 
|-id=248 bgcolor=#fefefe
| 98248 ||  || — || September 23, 2000 || Socorro || LINEAR || V || align=right | 2.0 km || 
|-id=249 bgcolor=#fefefe
| 98249 ||  || — || September 23, 2000 || Socorro || LINEAR || FLO || align=right | 2.2 km || 
|-id=250 bgcolor=#fefefe
| 98250 ||  || — || September 24, 2000 || Socorro || LINEAR || NYS || align=right | 1.6 km || 
|-id=251 bgcolor=#fefefe
| 98251 ||  || — || September 24, 2000 || Socorro || LINEAR || FLO || align=right | 1.4 km || 
|-id=252 bgcolor=#fefefe
| 98252 ||  || — || September 24, 2000 || Socorro || LINEAR || — || align=right | 3.9 km || 
|-id=253 bgcolor=#fefefe
| 98253 ||  || — || September 28, 2000 || Socorro || LINEAR || — || align=right | 4.2 km || 
|-id=254 bgcolor=#fefefe
| 98254 ||  || — || September 28, 2000 || Socorro || LINEAR || FLO || align=right | 2.3 km || 
|-id=255 bgcolor=#fefefe
| 98255 ||  || — || September 19, 2000 || Kitt Peak || Spacewatch || — || align=right | 2.0 km || 
|-id=256 bgcolor=#d6d6d6
| 98256 ||  || — || September 19, 2000 || Haleakala || NEAT || — || align=right | 4.8 km || 
|-id=257 bgcolor=#fefefe
| 98257 ||  || — || September 19, 2000 || Haleakala || NEAT || — || align=right | 2.0 km || 
|-id=258 bgcolor=#fefefe
| 98258 ||  || — || September 20, 2000 || Socorro || LINEAR || FLO || align=right | 1.8 km || 
|-id=259 bgcolor=#fefefe
| 98259 ||  || — || September 20, 2000 || Socorro || LINEAR || — || align=right | 1.9 km || 
|-id=260 bgcolor=#fefefe
| 98260 ||  || — || September 20, 2000 || Socorro || LINEAR || — || align=right | 2.3 km || 
|-id=261 bgcolor=#fefefe
| 98261 ||  || — || September 20, 2000 || Haleakala || NEAT || V || align=right | 1.4 km || 
|-id=262 bgcolor=#fefefe
| 98262 ||  || — || September 20, 2000 || Haleakala || NEAT || — || align=right | 4.7 km || 
|-id=263 bgcolor=#fefefe
| 98263 ||  || — || September 21, 2000 || Socorro || LINEAR || V || align=right | 1.4 km || 
|-id=264 bgcolor=#fefefe
| 98264 ||  || — || September 21, 2000 || Haleakala || NEAT || FLO || align=right | 1.4 km || 
|-id=265 bgcolor=#fefefe
| 98265 ||  || — || September 21, 2000 || Haleakala || NEAT || — || align=right | 2.0 km || 
|-id=266 bgcolor=#fefefe
| 98266 ||  || — || September 22, 2000 || Haleakala || NEAT || — || align=right | 1.4 km || 
|-id=267 bgcolor=#fefefe
| 98267 ||  || — || September 24, 2000 || Socorro || LINEAR || FLO || align=right | 1.5 km || 
|-id=268 bgcolor=#fefefe
| 98268 ||  || — || September 24, 2000 || Socorro || LINEAR || — || align=right | 2.9 km || 
|-id=269 bgcolor=#fefefe
| 98269 ||  || — || September 24, 2000 || Socorro || LINEAR || FLO || align=right | 1.2 km || 
|-id=270 bgcolor=#fefefe
| 98270 ||  || — || September 24, 2000 || Socorro || LINEAR || — || align=right | 1.8 km || 
|-id=271 bgcolor=#fefefe
| 98271 ||  || — || September 24, 2000 || Socorro || LINEAR || — || align=right | 1.8 km || 
|-id=272 bgcolor=#fefefe
| 98272 ||  || — || September 24, 2000 || Socorro || LINEAR || V || align=right | 2.3 km || 
|-id=273 bgcolor=#fefefe
| 98273 ||  || — || September 24, 2000 || Socorro || LINEAR || — || align=right | 1.6 km || 
|-id=274 bgcolor=#fefefe
| 98274 ||  || — || September 24, 2000 || Socorro || LINEAR || NYS || align=right | 1.4 km || 
|-id=275 bgcolor=#fefefe
| 98275 ||  || — || September 25, 2000 || Socorro || LINEAR || FLO || align=right | 1.6 km || 
|-id=276 bgcolor=#fefefe
| 98276 ||  || — || September 25, 2000 || Socorro || LINEAR || — || align=right | 2.2 km || 
|-id=277 bgcolor=#fefefe
| 98277 ||  || — || September 25, 2000 || Socorro || LINEAR || V || align=right | 1.9 km || 
|-id=278 bgcolor=#fefefe
| 98278 ||  || — || September 25, 2000 || Socorro || LINEAR || — || align=right | 1.6 km || 
|-id=279 bgcolor=#fefefe
| 98279 ||  || — || September 25, 2000 || Socorro || LINEAR || V || align=right | 1.9 km || 
|-id=280 bgcolor=#E9E9E9
| 98280 ||  || — || September 25, 2000 || Socorro || LINEAR || GER || align=right | 2.7 km || 
|-id=281 bgcolor=#fefefe
| 98281 ||  || — || September 26, 2000 || Socorro || LINEAR || V || align=right | 1.5 km || 
|-id=282 bgcolor=#fefefe
| 98282 ||  || — || September 26, 2000 || Socorro || LINEAR || — || align=right | 2.4 km || 
|-id=283 bgcolor=#fefefe
| 98283 ||  || — || September 26, 2000 || Socorro || LINEAR || — || align=right | 1.7 km || 
|-id=284 bgcolor=#fefefe
| 98284 ||  || — || September 26, 2000 || Socorro || LINEAR || V || align=right | 2.0 km || 
|-id=285 bgcolor=#fefefe
| 98285 ||  || — || September 26, 2000 || Socorro || LINEAR || V || align=right | 1.8 km || 
|-id=286 bgcolor=#fefefe
| 98286 ||  || — || September 26, 2000 || Socorro || LINEAR || — || align=right | 1.9 km || 
|-id=287 bgcolor=#fefefe
| 98287 ||  || — || September 26, 2000 || Socorro || LINEAR || LCI || align=right | 1.9 km || 
|-id=288 bgcolor=#fefefe
| 98288 ||  || — || September 27, 2000 || Socorro || LINEAR || NYS || align=right | 1.6 km || 
|-id=289 bgcolor=#fefefe
| 98289 ||  || — || September 27, 2000 || Socorro || LINEAR || — || align=right | 3.3 km || 
|-id=290 bgcolor=#fefefe
| 98290 ||  || — || September 28, 2000 || Socorro || LINEAR || — || align=right | 2.1 km || 
|-id=291 bgcolor=#fefefe
| 98291 ||  || — || September 28, 2000 || Socorro || LINEAR || — || align=right | 2.0 km || 
|-id=292 bgcolor=#fefefe
| 98292 ||  || — || September 28, 2000 || Socorro || LINEAR || — || align=right | 1.7 km || 
|-id=293 bgcolor=#fefefe
| 98293 ||  || — || September 28, 2000 || Socorro || LINEAR || — || align=right | 1.5 km || 
|-id=294 bgcolor=#fefefe
| 98294 ||  || — || September 28, 2000 || Socorro || LINEAR || NYS || align=right | 1.4 km || 
|-id=295 bgcolor=#fefefe
| 98295 ||  || — || September 30, 2000 || Socorro || LINEAR || V || align=right | 1.9 km || 
|-id=296 bgcolor=#fefefe
| 98296 ||  || — || September 28, 2000 || Socorro || LINEAR || — || align=right | 2.4 km || 
|-id=297 bgcolor=#fefefe
| 98297 ||  || — || September 21, 2000 || Socorro || LINEAR || V || align=right | 1.7 km || 
|-id=298 bgcolor=#fefefe
| 98298 ||  || — || September 22, 2000 || Socorro || LINEAR || — || align=right | 2.0 km || 
|-id=299 bgcolor=#fefefe
| 98299 ||  || — || September 24, 2000 || Socorro || LINEAR || — || align=right | 1.2 km || 
|-id=300 bgcolor=#fefefe
| 98300 ||  || — || September 24, 2000 || Socorro || LINEAR || — || align=right | 1.6 km || 
|}

98301–98400 

|-bgcolor=#fefefe
| 98301 ||  || — || September 25, 2000 || Socorro || LINEAR || FLO || align=right | 3.3 km || 
|-id=302 bgcolor=#FA8072
| 98302 ||  || — || September 25, 2000 || Socorro || LINEAR || — || align=right | 2.9 km || 
|-id=303 bgcolor=#fefefe
| 98303 ||  || — || September 25, 2000 || Socorro || LINEAR || — || align=right | 2.4 km || 
|-id=304 bgcolor=#fefefe
| 98304 ||  || — || September 23, 2000 || Socorro || LINEAR || — || align=right | 1.7 km || 
|-id=305 bgcolor=#fefefe
| 98305 ||  || — || September 24, 2000 || Socorro || LINEAR || V || align=right | 1.8 km || 
|-id=306 bgcolor=#fefefe
| 98306 ||  || — || September 24, 2000 || Socorro || LINEAR || — || align=right | 1.3 km || 
|-id=307 bgcolor=#fefefe
| 98307 ||  || — || September 24, 2000 || Socorro || LINEAR || NYS || align=right | 1.7 km || 
|-id=308 bgcolor=#fefefe
| 98308 ||  || — || September 24, 2000 || Socorro || LINEAR || — || align=right | 1.7 km || 
|-id=309 bgcolor=#fefefe
| 98309 ||  || — || September 24, 2000 || Socorro || LINEAR || FLO || align=right | 1.4 km || 
|-id=310 bgcolor=#fefefe
| 98310 ||  || — || September 24, 2000 || Socorro || LINEAR || FLO || align=right | 1.3 km || 
|-id=311 bgcolor=#fefefe
| 98311 ||  || — || September 24, 2000 || Socorro || LINEAR || — || align=right | 1.6 km || 
|-id=312 bgcolor=#fefefe
| 98312 ||  || — || September 24, 2000 || Socorro || LINEAR || NYS || align=right | 1.8 km || 
|-id=313 bgcolor=#fefefe
| 98313 ||  || — || September 24, 2000 || Socorro || LINEAR || ERI || align=right | 3.5 km || 
|-id=314 bgcolor=#fefefe
| 98314 ||  || — || September 24, 2000 || Socorro || LINEAR || — || align=right | 1.9 km || 
|-id=315 bgcolor=#fefefe
| 98315 ||  || — || September 24, 2000 || Socorro || LINEAR || FLO || align=right | 1.8 km || 
|-id=316 bgcolor=#fefefe
| 98316 ||  || — || September 24, 2000 || Socorro || LINEAR || — || align=right | 2.4 km || 
|-id=317 bgcolor=#fefefe
| 98317 ||  || — || September 25, 2000 || Socorro || LINEAR || FLO || align=right | 2.6 km || 
|-id=318 bgcolor=#fefefe
| 98318 ||  || — || September 26, 2000 || Socorro || LINEAR || NYS || align=right | 1.7 km || 
|-id=319 bgcolor=#fefefe
| 98319 ||  || — || September 26, 2000 || Socorro || LINEAR || — || align=right | 3.3 km || 
|-id=320 bgcolor=#E9E9E9
| 98320 ||  || — || September 27, 2000 || Socorro || LINEAR || — || align=right | 3.3 km || 
|-id=321 bgcolor=#fefefe
| 98321 ||  || — || September 27, 2000 || Socorro || LINEAR || V || align=right | 2.2 km || 
|-id=322 bgcolor=#fefefe
| 98322 ||  || — || September 27, 2000 || Socorro || LINEAR || FLO || align=right | 1.3 km || 
|-id=323 bgcolor=#fefefe
| 98323 ||  || — || September 27, 2000 || Socorro || LINEAR || — || align=right | 2.2 km || 
|-id=324 bgcolor=#fefefe
| 98324 ||  || — || September 27, 2000 || Socorro || LINEAR || — || align=right | 1.6 km || 
|-id=325 bgcolor=#fefefe
| 98325 ||  || — || September 28, 2000 || Socorro || LINEAR || — || align=right | 2.4 km || 
|-id=326 bgcolor=#fefefe
| 98326 ||  || — || September 28, 2000 || Socorro || LINEAR || — || align=right | 2.2 km || 
|-id=327 bgcolor=#fefefe
| 98327 ||  || — || September 28, 2000 || Socorro || LINEAR || — || align=right | 1.7 km || 
|-id=328 bgcolor=#fefefe
| 98328 ||  || — || September 30, 2000 || Socorro || LINEAR || FLO || align=right | 1.4 km || 
|-id=329 bgcolor=#fefefe
| 98329 ||  || — || September 30, 2000 || Socorro || LINEAR || NYS || align=right | 1.5 km || 
|-id=330 bgcolor=#fefefe
| 98330 ||  || — || September 24, 2000 || Socorro || LINEAR || NYS || align=right | 1.4 km || 
|-id=331 bgcolor=#fefefe
| 98331 ||  || — || September 27, 2000 || Socorro || LINEAR || — || align=right | 1.6 km || 
|-id=332 bgcolor=#fefefe
| 98332 ||  || — || September 27, 2000 || Socorro || LINEAR || — || align=right | 3.4 km || 
|-id=333 bgcolor=#FA8072
| 98333 ||  || — || September 27, 2000 || Socorro || LINEAR || — || align=right | 2.3 km || 
|-id=334 bgcolor=#fefefe
| 98334 ||  || — || September 27, 2000 || Socorro || LINEAR || — || align=right | 2.1 km || 
|-id=335 bgcolor=#fefefe
| 98335 ||  || — || September 27, 2000 || Socorro || LINEAR || FLO || align=right | 2.9 km || 
|-id=336 bgcolor=#fefefe
| 98336 ||  || — || September 27, 2000 || Socorro || LINEAR || V || align=right | 1.8 km || 
|-id=337 bgcolor=#fefefe
| 98337 ||  || — || September 27, 2000 || Socorro || LINEAR || — || align=right | 2.5 km || 
|-id=338 bgcolor=#fefefe
| 98338 ||  || — || September 27, 2000 || Socorro || LINEAR || — || align=right | 2.2 km || 
|-id=339 bgcolor=#fefefe
| 98339 ||  || — || September 27, 2000 || Socorro || LINEAR || — || align=right | 2.6 km || 
|-id=340 bgcolor=#fefefe
| 98340 ||  || — || September 28, 2000 || Socorro || LINEAR || V || align=right | 1.3 km || 
|-id=341 bgcolor=#fefefe
| 98341 ||  || — || September 28, 2000 || Socorro || LINEAR || V || align=right | 1.5 km || 
|-id=342 bgcolor=#fefefe
| 98342 ||  || — || September 28, 2000 || Socorro || LINEAR || slow? || align=right | 1.5 km || 
|-id=343 bgcolor=#fefefe
| 98343 ||  || — || September 28, 2000 || Socorro || LINEAR || V || align=right | 1.2 km || 
|-id=344 bgcolor=#fefefe
| 98344 ||  || — || September 28, 2000 || Socorro || LINEAR || — || align=right | 1.7 km || 
|-id=345 bgcolor=#fefefe
| 98345 ||  || — || September 30, 2000 || Socorro || LINEAR || ERI || align=right | 4.6 km || 
|-id=346 bgcolor=#fefefe
| 98346 ||  || — || September 30, 2000 || Socorro || LINEAR || — || align=right | 1.8 km || 
|-id=347 bgcolor=#fefefe
| 98347 ||  || — || September 30, 2000 || Socorro || LINEAR || — || align=right | 1.8 km || 
|-id=348 bgcolor=#fefefe
| 98348 ||  || — || September 30, 2000 || Socorro || LINEAR || — || align=right | 1.8 km || 
|-id=349 bgcolor=#fefefe
| 98349 ||  || — || September 24, 2000 || Socorro || LINEAR || — || align=right | 2.7 km || 
|-id=350 bgcolor=#fefefe
| 98350 ||  || — || September 29, 2000 || Haleakala || NEAT || — || align=right | 1.8 km || 
|-id=351 bgcolor=#fefefe
| 98351 ||  || — || September 28, 2000 || Kitt Peak || Spacewatch || NYS || align=right | 2.9 km || 
|-id=352 bgcolor=#fefefe
| 98352 ||  || — || September 30, 2000 || Socorro || LINEAR || — || align=right | 2.6 km || 
|-id=353 bgcolor=#fefefe
| 98353 ||  || — || September 27, 2000 || Kitt Peak || Spacewatch || — || align=right | 1.3 km || 
|-id=354 bgcolor=#fefefe
| 98354 ||  || — || September 27, 2000 || Kitt Peak || Spacewatch || — || align=right | 1.8 km || 
|-id=355 bgcolor=#fefefe
| 98355 ||  || — || September 26, 2000 || Haleakala || NEAT || V || align=right | 2.1 km || 
|-id=356 bgcolor=#fefefe
| 98356 ||  || — || September 26, 2000 || Haleakala || NEAT || — || align=right | 1.9 km || 
|-id=357 bgcolor=#fefefe
| 98357 ||  || — || September 26, 2000 || Haleakala || NEAT || — || align=right | 2.1 km || 
|-id=358 bgcolor=#fefefe
| 98358 ||  || — || September 26, 2000 || Haleakala || NEAT || V || align=right | 2.0 km || 
|-id=359 bgcolor=#E9E9E9
| 98359 ||  || — || September 30, 2000 || Anderson Mesa || LONEOS || — || align=right | 3.8 km || 
|-id=360 bgcolor=#fefefe
| 98360 ||  || — || September 29, 2000 || Anderson Mesa || LONEOS || — || align=right | 2.2 km || 
|-id=361 bgcolor=#C2FFFF
| 98361 ||  || — || September 23, 2000 || Anderson Mesa || LONEOS || L5 || align=right | 19 km || 
|-id=362 bgcolor=#C2FFFF
| 98362 ||  || — || September 21, 2000 || Anderson Mesa || LONEOS || L5ENM || align=right | 14 km || 
|-id=363 bgcolor=#fefefe
| 98363 ||  || — || September 21, 2000 || Anderson Mesa || LONEOS || — || align=right | 1.4 km || 
|-id=364 bgcolor=#fefefe
| 98364 ||  || — || September 20, 2000 || Socorro || LINEAR || V || align=right | 1.7 km || 
|-id=365 bgcolor=#fefefe
| 98365 ||  || — || September 22, 2000 || Haleakala || NEAT || — || align=right | 2.1 km || 
|-id=366 bgcolor=#fefefe
| 98366 ||  || — || October 1, 2000 || Socorro || LINEAR || NYS || align=right | 1.2 km || 
|-id=367 bgcolor=#fefefe
| 98367 ||  || — || October 1, 2000 || Socorro || LINEAR || MAS || align=right | 1.6 km || 
|-id=368 bgcolor=#fefefe
| 98368 ||  || — || October 1, 2000 || Socorro || LINEAR || — || align=right | 1.3 km || 
|-id=369 bgcolor=#fefefe
| 98369 ||  || — || October 1, 2000 || Socorro || LINEAR || V || align=right | 1.5 km || 
|-id=370 bgcolor=#fefefe
| 98370 ||  || — || October 1, 2000 || Socorro || LINEAR || — || align=right | 1.4 km || 
|-id=371 bgcolor=#fefefe
| 98371 ||  || — || October 1, 2000 || Socorro || LINEAR || V || align=right | 1.4 km || 
|-id=372 bgcolor=#fefefe
| 98372 ||  || — || October 1, 2000 || Socorro || LINEAR || V || align=right | 1.4 km || 
|-id=373 bgcolor=#fefefe
| 98373 ||  || — || October 1, 2000 || Socorro || LINEAR || — || align=right | 2.2 km || 
|-id=374 bgcolor=#fefefe
| 98374 ||  || — || October 1, 2000 || Socorro || LINEAR || — || align=right | 1.3 km || 
|-id=375 bgcolor=#fefefe
| 98375 ||  || — || October 1, 2000 || Socorro || LINEAR || MAS || align=right | 1.7 km || 
|-id=376 bgcolor=#fefefe
| 98376 ||  || — || October 2, 2000 || Socorro || LINEAR || ERI || align=right | 4.3 km || 
|-id=377 bgcolor=#fefefe
| 98377 ||  || — || October 2, 2000 || Socorro || LINEAR || — || align=right | 2.4 km || 
|-id=378 bgcolor=#fefefe
| 98378 ||  || — || October 3, 2000 || Socorro || LINEAR || — || align=right | 1.8 km || 
|-id=379 bgcolor=#fefefe
| 98379 ||  || — || October 4, 2000 || Socorro || LINEAR || PHO || align=right | 3.4 km || 
|-id=380 bgcolor=#fefefe
| 98380 ||  || — || October 6, 2000 || Anderson Mesa || LONEOS || — || align=right | 1.5 km || 
|-id=381 bgcolor=#fefefe
| 98381 ||  || — || October 1, 2000 || Socorro || LINEAR || FLO || align=right | 1.9 km || 
|-id=382 bgcolor=#fefefe
| 98382 ||  || — || October 1, 2000 || Socorro || LINEAR || — || align=right | 1.9 km || 
|-id=383 bgcolor=#fefefe
| 98383 ||  || — || October 1, 2000 || Socorro || LINEAR || FLO || align=right | 2.4 km || 
|-id=384 bgcolor=#fefefe
| 98384 ||  || — || October 1, 2000 || Socorro || LINEAR || V || align=right | 1.3 km || 
|-id=385 bgcolor=#fefefe
| 98385 ||  || — || October 1, 2000 || Socorro || LINEAR || NYS || align=right | 4.3 km || 
|-id=386 bgcolor=#E9E9E9
| 98386 ||  || — || October 1, 2000 || Socorro || LINEAR || — || align=right | 5.9 km || 
|-id=387 bgcolor=#fefefe
| 98387 ||  || — || October 1, 2000 || Socorro || LINEAR || — || align=right | 2.6 km || 
|-id=388 bgcolor=#fefefe
| 98388 ||  || — || October 2, 2000 || Socorro || LINEAR || — || align=right | 3.9 km || 
|-id=389 bgcolor=#fefefe
| 98389 ||  || — || October 2, 2000 || Socorro || LINEAR || NYS || align=right | 1.5 km || 
|-id=390 bgcolor=#fefefe
| 98390 ||  || — || October 2, 2000 || Anderson Mesa || LONEOS || — || align=right | 1.9 km || 
|-id=391 bgcolor=#fefefe
| 98391 ||  || — || October 2, 2000 || Socorro || LINEAR || SUL || align=right | 4.5 km || 
|-id=392 bgcolor=#fefefe
| 98392 || 2000 UC || — || October 18, 2000 || Bisei SG Center || BATTeRS || ERI || align=right | 3.4 km || 
|-id=393 bgcolor=#E9E9E9
| 98393 ||  || — || October 23, 2000 || Višnjan Observatory || K. Korlević || — || align=right | 6.2 km || 
|-id=394 bgcolor=#fefefe
| 98394 ||  || — || October 23, 2000 || Višnjan Observatory || K. Korlević || — || align=right | 2.1 km || 
|-id=395 bgcolor=#E9E9E9
| 98395 ||  || — || October 24, 2000 || Desert Beaver || W. K. Y. Yeung || EUN || align=right | 3.8 km || 
|-id=396 bgcolor=#fefefe
| 98396 ||  || — || October 24, 2000 || Desert Beaver || W. K. Y. Yeung || — || align=right | 2.6 km || 
|-id=397 bgcolor=#fefefe
| 98397 ||  || — || October 24, 2000 || Črni Vrh || Črni Vrh || NYS || align=right | 3.9 km || 
|-id=398 bgcolor=#fefefe
| 98398 ||  || — || October 24, 2000 || Socorro || LINEAR || — || align=right | 2.8 km || 
|-id=399 bgcolor=#fefefe
| 98399 ||  || — || October 24, 2000 || Socorro || LINEAR || NYS || align=right | 4.9 km || 
|-id=400 bgcolor=#fefefe
| 98400 ||  || — || October 24, 2000 || Socorro || LINEAR || NYS || align=right | 4.9 km || 
|}

98401–98500 

|-bgcolor=#fefefe
| 98401 ||  || — || October 24, 2000 || Socorro || LINEAR || V || align=right | 1.8 km || 
|-id=402 bgcolor=#fefefe
| 98402 ||  || — || October 24, 2000 || Socorro || LINEAR || — || align=right | 1.5 km || 
|-id=403 bgcolor=#fefefe
| 98403 ||  || — || October 24, 2000 || Socorro || LINEAR || V || align=right | 2.2 km || 
|-id=404 bgcolor=#E9E9E9
| 98404 ||  || — || October 24, 2000 || Socorro || LINEAR || — || align=right | 3.4 km || 
|-id=405 bgcolor=#E9E9E9
| 98405 ||  || — || October 24, 2000 || Socorro || LINEAR || — || align=right | 3.2 km || 
|-id=406 bgcolor=#fefefe
| 98406 ||  || — || October 24, 2000 || Socorro || LINEAR || V || align=right | 1.7 km || 
|-id=407 bgcolor=#fefefe
| 98407 ||  || — || October 25, 2000 || Socorro || LINEAR || V || align=right | 1.4 km || 
|-id=408 bgcolor=#fefefe
| 98408 ||  || — || October 19, 2000 || Olathe || L. Robinson || NYS || align=right | 1.9 km || 
|-id=409 bgcolor=#fefefe
| 98409 ||  || — || October 25, 2000 || Socorro || LINEAR || NYS || align=right | 1.1 km || 
|-id=410 bgcolor=#fefefe
| 98410 ||  || — || October 25, 2000 || Socorro || LINEAR || FLO || align=right | 1.8 km || 
|-id=411 bgcolor=#fefefe
| 98411 ||  || — || October 24, 2000 || Desert Beaver || W. K. Y. Yeung || — || align=right | 2.3 km || 
|-id=412 bgcolor=#fefefe
| 98412 ||  || — || October 25, 2000 || Socorro || LINEAR || — || align=right | 2.2 km || 
|-id=413 bgcolor=#fefefe
| 98413 ||  || — || October 29, 2000 || Fountain Hills || C. W. Juels || V || align=right | 2.2 km || 
|-id=414 bgcolor=#fefefe
| 98414 ||  || — || October 24, 2000 || Socorro || LINEAR || — || align=right | 1.6 km || 
|-id=415 bgcolor=#fefefe
| 98415 ||  || — || October 24, 2000 || Socorro || LINEAR || — || align=right | 3.8 km || 
|-id=416 bgcolor=#fefefe
| 98416 ||  || — || October 24, 2000 || Socorro || LINEAR || MAS || align=right | 2.3 km || 
|-id=417 bgcolor=#fefefe
| 98417 ||  || — || October 24, 2000 || Socorro || LINEAR || NYS || align=right | 1.3 km || 
|-id=418 bgcolor=#fefefe
| 98418 ||  || — || October 24, 2000 || Socorro || LINEAR || V || align=right | 1.5 km || 
|-id=419 bgcolor=#fefefe
| 98419 ||  || — || October 24, 2000 || Socorro || LINEAR || — || align=right | 2.1 km || 
|-id=420 bgcolor=#fefefe
| 98420 ||  || — || October 24, 2000 || Socorro || LINEAR || FLO || align=right | 1.2 km || 
|-id=421 bgcolor=#fefefe
| 98421 ||  || — || October 24, 2000 || Socorro || LINEAR || — || align=right | 1.8 km || 
|-id=422 bgcolor=#fefefe
| 98422 ||  || — || October 24, 2000 || Socorro || LINEAR || FLO || align=right | 1.8 km || 
|-id=423 bgcolor=#fefefe
| 98423 ||  || — || October 24, 2000 || Socorro || LINEAR || — || align=right | 2.6 km || 
|-id=424 bgcolor=#fefefe
| 98424 ||  || — || October 25, 2000 || Socorro || LINEAR || V || align=right | 1.5 km || 
|-id=425 bgcolor=#fefefe
| 98425 ||  || — || October 30, 2000 || Kitt Peak || Spacewatch || NYS || align=right | 1.4 km || 
|-id=426 bgcolor=#fefefe
| 98426 ||  || — || October 24, 2000 || Socorro || LINEAR || — || align=right | 2.3 km || 
|-id=427 bgcolor=#fefefe
| 98427 ||  || — || October 24, 2000 || Socorro || LINEAR || V || align=right | 1.3 km || 
|-id=428 bgcolor=#fefefe
| 98428 ||  || — || October 24, 2000 || Socorro || LINEAR || — || align=right | 2.3 km || 
|-id=429 bgcolor=#fefefe
| 98429 ||  || — || October 24, 2000 || Socorro || LINEAR || NYS || align=right | 1.7 km || 
|-id=430 bgcolor=#fefefe
| 98430 ||  || — || October 24, 2000 || Socorro || LINEAR || V || align=right | 1.8 km || 
|-id=431 bgcolor=#E9E9E9
| 98431 ||  || — || October 24, 2000 || Socorro || LINEAR || — || align=right | 2.2 km || 
|-id=432 bgcolor=#fefefe
| 98432 ||  || — || October 24, 2000 || Socorro || LINEAR || — || align=right | 3.2 km || 
|-id=433 bgcolor=#fefefe
| 98433 ||  || — || October 24, 2000 || Socorro || LINEAR || V || align=right | 1.6 km || 
|-id=434 bgcolor=#fefefe
| 98434 ||  || — || October 24, 2000 || Socorro || LINEAR || — || align=right | 4.5 km || 
|-id=435 bgcolor=#fefefe
| 98435 ||  || — || October 24, 2000 || Socorro || LINEAR || NYS || align=right | 1.6 km || 
|-id=436 bgcolor=#fefefe
| 98436 ||  || — || October 24, 2000 || Socorro || LINEAR || V || align=right | 1.8 km || 
|-id=437 bgcolor=#fefefe
| 98437 ||  || — || October 24, 2000 || Socorro || LINEAR || NYS || align=right | 3.1 km || 
|-id=438 bgcolor=#fefefe
| 98438 ||  || — || October 24, 2000 || Socorro || LINEAR || — || align=right | 3.4 km || 
|-id=439 bgcolor=#fefefe
| 98439 ||  || — || October 24, 2000 || Socorro || LINEAR || — || align=right | 2.0 km || 
|-id=440 bgcolor=#E9E9E9
| 98440 ||  || — || October 24, 2000 || Socorro || LINEAR || — || align=right | 5.2 km || 
|-id=441 bgcolor=#E9E9E9
| 98441 ||  || — || October 24, 2000 || Socorro || LINEAR || — || align=right | 4.2 km || 
|-id=442 bgcolor=#E9E9E9
| 98442 ||  || — || October 24, 2000 || Socorro || LINEAR || — || align=right | 2.5 km || 
|-id=443 bgcolor=#fefefe
| 98443 ||  || — || October 25, 2000 || Socorro || LINEAR || — || align=right | 1.4 km || 
|-id=444 bgcolor=#fefefe
| 98444 ||  || — || October 25, 2000 || Socorro || LINEAR || — || align=right | 2.2 km || 
|-id=445 bgcolor=#fefefe
| 98445 ||  || — || October 25, 2000 || Socorro || LINEAR || — || align=right | 1.7 km || 
|-id=446 bgcolor=#fefefe
| 98446 ||  || — || October 25, 2000 || Socorro || LINEAR || — || align=right | 2.3 km || 
|-id=447 bgcolor=#fefefe
| 98447 ||  || — || October 25, 2000 || Socorro || LINEAR || — || align=right | 1.5 km || 
|-id=448 bgcolor=#fefefe
| 98448 ||  || — || October 25, 2000 || Socorro || LINEAR || — || align=right | 1.7 km || 
|-id=449 bgcolor=#fefefe
| 98449 ||  || — || October 25, 2000 || Socorro || LINEAR || V || align=right | 1.7 km || 
|-id=450 bgcolor=#fefefe
| 98450 ||  || — || October 25, 2000 || Socorro || LINEAR || V || align=right | 1.5 km || 
|-id=451 bgcolor=#fefefe
| 98451 ||  || — || October 25, 2000 || Socorro || LINEAR || V || align=right | 1.7 km || 
|-id=452 bgcolor=#fefefe
| 98452 ||  || — || October 25, 2000 || Socorro || LINEAR || — || align=right | 1.6 km || 
|-id=453 bgcolor=#fefefe
| 98453 ||  || — || October 25, 2000 || Socorro || LINEAR || — || align=right | 2.1 km || 
|-id=454 bgcolor=#fefefe
| 98454 ||  || — || October 25, 2000 || Socorro || LINEAR || — || align=right | 1.8 km || 
|-id=455 bgcolor=#fefefe
| 98455 ||  || — || October 25, 2000 || Socorro || LINEAR || V || align=right | 1.4 km || 
|-id=456 bgcolor=#fefefe
| 98456 ||  || — || October 25, 2000 || Socorro || LINEAR || — || align=right | 2.1 km || 
|-id=457 bgcolor=#fefefe
| 98457 ||  || — || October 25, 2000 || Socorro || LINEAR || — || align=right | 4.4 km || 
|-id=458 bgcolor=#fefefe
| 98458 ||  || — || October 25, 2000 || Socorro || LINEAR || — || align=right | 1.7 km || 
|-id=459 bgcolor=#E9E9E9
| 98459 ||  || — || October 25, 2000 || Socorro || LINEAR || — || align=right | 3.0 km || 
|-id=460 bgcolor=#fefefe
| 98460 ||  || — || October 26, 2000 || Socorro || LINEAR || NYS || align=right | 1.3 km || 
|-id=461 bgcolor=#fefefe
| 98461 ||  || — || October 24, 2000 || Socorro || LINEAR || NYS || align=right | 1.6 km || 
|-id=462 bgcolor=#E9E9E9
| 98462 ||  || — || October 24, 2000 || Socorro || LINEAR || — || align=right | 2.3 km || 
|-id=463 bgcolor=#fefefe
| 98463 ||  || — || October 24, 2000 || Socorro || LINEAR || PHO || align=right | 6.8 km || 
|-id=464 bgcolor=#fefefe
| 98464 ||  || — || October 31, 2000 || Socorro || LINEAR || NYS || align=right | 1.9 km || 
|-id=465 bgcolor=#fefefe
| 98465 ||  || — || October 31, 2000 || Socorro || LINEAR || — || align=right | 1.4 km || 
|-id=466 bgcolor=#fefefe
| 98466 ||  || — || October 25, 2000 || Socorro || LINEAR || — || align=right | 1.4 km || 
|-id=467 bgcolor=#fefefe
| 98467 ||  || — || October 25, 2000 || Socorro || LINEAR || — || align=right | 2.1 km || 
|-id=468 bgcolor=#E9E9E9
| 98468 ||  || — || October 25, 2000 || Socorro || LINEAR || — || align=right | 4.2 km || 
|-id=469 bgcolor=#fefefe
| 98469 ||  || — || October 25, 2000 || Socorro || LINEAR || FLO || align=right | 1.5 km || 
|-id=470 bgcolor=#fefefe
| 98470 ||  || — || October 25, 2000 || Socorro || LINEAR || — || align=right | 2.2 km || 
|-id=471 bgcolor=#fefefe
| 98471 ||  || — || October 25, 2000 || Socorro || LINEAR || — || align=right | 2.1 km || 
|-id=472 bgcolor=#fefefe
| 98472 ||  || — || October 25, 2000 || Socorro || LINEAR || — || align=right | 2.2 km || 
|-id=473 bgcolor=#fefefe
| 98473 ||  || — || October 25, 2000 || Socorro || LINEAR || — || align=right | 2.5 km || 
|-id=474 bgcolor=#fefefe
| 98474 ||  || — || October 25, 2000 || Socorro || LINEAR || FLO || align=right | 1.3 km || 
|-id=475 bgcolor=#fefefe
| 98475 ||  || — || October 25, 2000 || Socorro || LINEAR || — || align=right | 4.0 km || 
|-id=476 bgcolor=#fefefe
| 98476 ||  || — || October 25, 2000 || Socorro || LINEAR || V || align=right | 1.3 km || 
|-id=477 bgcolor=#fefefe
| 98477 ||  || — || October 25, 2000 || Socorro || LINEAR || — || align=right | 2.4 km || 
|-id=478 bgcolor=#fefefe
| 98478 ||  || — || October 25, 2000 || Socorro || LINEAR || V || align=right | 1.4 km || 
|-id=479 bgcolor=#fefefe
| 98479 ||  || — || October 25, 2000 || Socorro || LINEAR || V || align=right | 2.0 km || 
|-id=480 bgcolor=#fefefe
| 98480 ||  || — || October 25, 2000 || Socorro || LINEAR || V || align=right | 1.5 km || 
|-id=481 bgcolor=#E9E9E9
| 98481 ||  || — || October 25, 2000 || Socorro || LINEAR || — || align=right | 3.0 km || 
|-id=482 bgcolor=#fefefe
| 98482 ||  || — || October 25, 2000 || Socorro || LINEAR || V || align=right | 2.3 km || 
|-id=483 bgcolor=#fefefe
| 98483 ||  || — || October 25, 2000 || Socorro || LINEAR || FLO || align=right | 1.5 km || 
|-id=484 bgcolor=#fefefe
| 98484 ||  || — || October 25, 2000 || Socorro || LINEAR || — || align=right | 2.3 km || 
|-id=485 bgcolor=#fefefe
| 98485 ||  || — || October 29, 2000 || Socorro || LINEAR || V || align=right | 1.7 km || 
|-id=486 bgcolor=#fefefe
| 98486 ||  || — || October 29, 2000 || Socorro || LINEAR || — || align=right | 1.7 km || 
|-id=487 bgcolor=#E9E9E9
| 98487 ||  || — || October 29, 2000 || Socorro || LINEAR || — || align=right | 2.4 km || 
|-id=488 bgcolor=#fefefe
| 98488 ||  || — || October 30, 2000 || Socorro || LINEAR || — || align=right | 2.0 km || 
|-id=489 bgcolor=#fefefe
| 98489 ||  || — || October 30, 2000 || Socorro || LINEAR || KLI || align=right | 4.2 km || 
|-id=490 bgcolor=#fefefe
| 98490 ||  || — || October 30, 2000 || Socorro || LINEAR || V || align=right | 1.3 km || 
|-id=491 bgcolor=#fefefe
| 98491 ||  || — || October 31, 2000 || Socorro || LINEAR || V || align=right | 1.3 km || 
|-id=492 bgcolor=#E9E9E9
| 98492 ||  || — || October 31, 2000 || Socorro || LINEAR || — || align=right | 3.4 km || 
|-id=493 bgcolor=#fefefe
| 98493 ||  || — || October 26, 2000 || Kitt Peak || Spacewatch || NYS || align=right | 1.2 km || 
|-id=494 bgcolor=#fefefe
| 98494 Marsupilami ||  ||  || October 27, 2000 || Le Creusot || J.-C. Merlin || NYS || align=right | 1.4 km || 
|-id=495 bgcolor=#fefefe
| 98495 ||  || — || November 1, 2000 || Desert Beaver || W. K. Y. Yeung || FLO || align=right | 1.9 km || 
|-id=496 bgcolor=#E9E9E9
| 98496 ||  || — || November 1, 2000 || Socorro || LINEAR || — || align=right | 4.2 km || 
|-id=497 bgcolor=#fefefe
| 98497 ||  || — || November 1, 2000 || Socorro || LINEAR || — || align=right | 1.7 km || 
|-id=498 bgcolor=#fefefe
| 98498 ||  || — || November 1, 2000 || Socorro || LINEAR || NYS || align=right | 1.7 km || 
|-id=499 bgcolor=#E9E9E9
| 98499 ||  || — || November 1, 2000 || Socorro || LINEAR || — || align=right | 2.2 km || 
|-id=500 bgcolor=#fefefe
| 98500 ||  || — || November 1, 2000 || Socorro || LINEAR || FLO || align=right | 1.9 km || 
|}

98501–98600 

|-bgcolor=#fefefe
| 98501 ||  || — || November 1, 2000 || Socorro || LINEAR || V || align=right | 1.4 km || 
|-id=502 bgcolor=#fefefe
| 98502 ||  || — || November 1, 2000 || Socorro || LINEAR || — || align=right | 1.6 km || 
|-id=503 bgcolor=#fefefe
| 98503 ||  || — || November 1, 2000 || Socorro || LINEAR || — || align=right | 2.2 km || 
|-id=504 bgcolor=#fefefe
| 98504 ||  || — || November 1, 2000 || Socorro || LINEAR || NYS || align=right | 1.8 km || 
|-id=505 bgcolor=#E9E9E9
| 98505 ||  || — || November 1, 2000 || Socorro || LINEAR || — || align=right | 3.1 km || 
|-id=506 bgcolor=#E9E9E9
| 98506 ||  || — || November 1, 2000 || Socorro || LINEAR || EUN || align=right | 3.3 km || 
|-id=507 bgcolor=#fefefe
| 98507 ||  || — || November 1, 2000 || Socorro || LINEAR || NYS || align=right | 1.7 km || 
|-id=508 bgcolor=#fefefe
| 98508 ||  || — || November 1, 2000 || Socorro || LINEAR || NYS || align=right | 1.8 km || 
|-id=509 bgcolor=#fefefe
| 98509 ||  || — || November 1, 2000 || Socorro || LINEAR || — || align=right | 1.7 km || 
|-id=510 bgcolor=#fefefe
| 98510 ||  || — || November 1, 2000 || Socorro || LINEAR || — || align=right | 2.3 km || 
|-id=511 bgcolor=#fefefe
| 98511 ||  || — || November 1, 2000 || Socorro || LINEAR || NYS || align=right | 1.3 km || 
|-id=512 bgcolor=#E9E9E9
| 98512 ||  || — || November 1, 2000 || Socorro || LINEAR || MAR || align=right | 2.4 km || 
|-id=513 bgcolor=#fefefe
| 98513 ||  || — || November 1, 2000 || Socorro || LINEAR || MAS || align=right | 1.4 km || 
|-id=514 bgcolor=#fefefe
| 98514 ||  || — || November 1, 2000 || Socorro || LINEAR || — || align=right | 2.0 km || 
|-id=515 bgcolor=#E9E9E9
| 98515 ||  || — || November 1, 2000 || Socorro || LINEAR || — || align=right | 2.7 km || 
|-id=516 bgcolor=#fefefe
| 98516 ||  || — || November 1, 2000 || Socorro || LINEAR || — || align=right | 1.4 km || 
|-id=517 bgcolor=#E9E9E9
| 98517 ||  || — || November 1, 2000 || Socorro || LINEAR || — || align=right | 2.8 km || 
|-id=518 bgcolor=#fefefe
| 98518 ||  || — || November 1, 2000 || Socorro || LINEAR || FLO || align=right | 1.6 km || 
|-id=519 bgcolor=#fefefe
| 98519 ||  || — || November 1, 2000 || Socorro || LINEAR || — || align=right | 2.3 km || 
|-id=520 bgcolor=#fefefe
| 98520 ||  || — || November 1, 2000 || Socorro || LINEAR || — || align=right | 2.0 km || 
|-id=521 bgcolor=#E9E9E9
| 98521 ||  || — || November 1, 2000 || Socorro || LINEAR || MAR || align=right | 2.4 km || 
|-id=522 bgcolor=#fefefe
| 98522 ||  || — || November 1, 2000 || Socorro || LINEAR || PHO || align=right | 2.8 km || 
|-id=523 bgcolor=#fefefe
| 98523 ||  || — || November 1, 2000 || Socorro || LINEAR || — || align=right | 2.5 km || 
|-id=524 bgcolor=#fefefe
| 98524 ||  || — || November 1, 2000 || Socorro || LINEAR || — || align=right | 2.6 km || 
|-id=525 bgcolor=#fefefe
| 98525 ||  || — || November 1, 2000 || Socorro || LINEAR || NYS || align=right | 1.9 km || 
|-id=526 bgcolor=#fefefe
| 98526 ||  || — || November 1, 2000 || Socorro || LINEAR || NYS || align=right | 1.5 km || 
|-id=527 bgcolor=#fefefe
| 98527 ||  || — || November 1, 2000 || Socorro || LINEAR || — || align=right | 3.1 km || 
|-id=528 bgcolor=#fefefe
| 98528 ||  || — || November 1, 2000 || Socorro || LINEAR || MAS || align=right | 1.7 km || 
|-id=529 bgcolor=#fefefe
| 98529 ||  || — || November 1, 2000 || Socorro || LINEAR || — || align=right | 2.1 km || 
|-id=530 bgcolor=#fefefe
| 98530 ||  || — || November 1, 2000 || Socorro || LINEAR || NYS || align=right | 4.1 km || 
|-id=531 bgcolor=#fefefe
| 98531 ||  || — || November 1, 2000 || Desert Beaver || W. K. Y. Yeung || — || align=right | 1.8 km || 
|-id=532 bgcolor=#fefefe
| 98532 ||  || — || November 1, 2000 || Socorro || LINEAR || — || align=right | 2.3 km || 
|-id=533 bgcolor=#E9E9E9
| 98533 ||  || — || November 1, 2000 || Socorro || LINEAR || — || align=right | 2.0 km || 
|-id=534 bgcolor=#fefefe
| 98534 ||  || — || November 3, 2000 || Socorro || LINEAR || — || align=right | 2.8 km || 
|-id=535 bgcolor=#fefefe
| 98535 ||  || — || November 3, 2000 || Socorro || LINEAR || — || align=right | 2.0 km || 
|-id=536 bgcolor=#fefefe
| 98536 ||  || — || November 3, 2000 || Socorro || LINEAR || — || align=right | 3.5 km || 
|-id=537 bgcolor=#fefefe
| 98537 ||  || — || November 3, 2000 || Socorro || LINEAR || — || align=right | 3.7 km || 
|-id=538 bgcolor=#E9E9E9
| 98538 ||  || — || November 2, 2000 || Socorro || LINEAR || — || align=right | 2.1 km || 
|-id=539 bgcolor=#fefefe
| 98539 ||  || — || November 2, 2000 || Socorro || LINEAR || NYS || align=right | 3.4 km || 
|-id=540 bgcolor=#fefefe
| 98540 ||  || — || November 2, 2000 || Socorro || LINEAR || NYS || align=right | 1.2 km || 
|-id=541 bgcolor=#fefefe
| 98541 ||  || — || November 2, 2000 || Socorro || LINEAR || V || align=right | 1.8 km || 
|-id=542 bgcolor=#fefefe
| 98542 ||  || — || November 3, 2000 || Socorro || LINEAR || FLO || align=right | 1.4 km || 
|-id=543 bgcolor=#fefefe
| 98543 ||  || — || November 3, 2000 || Socorro || LINEAR || — || align=right | 1.4 km || 
|-id=544 bgcolor=#fefefe
| 98544 ||  || — || November 3, 2000 || Socorro || LINEAR || NYS || align=right | 1.8 km || 
|-id=545 bgcolor=#fefefe
| 98545 ||  || — || November 3, 2000 || Socorro || LINEAR || — || align=right | 1.8 km || 
|-id=546 bgcolor=#fefefe
| 98546 ||  || — || November 3, 2000 || Socorro || LINEAR || — || align=right | 1.7 km || 
|-id=547 bgcolor=#fefefe
| 98547 ||  || — || November 3, 2000 || Socorro || LINEAR || — || align=right | 1.8 km || 
|-id=548 bgcolor=#fefefe
| 98548 ||  || — || November 3, 2000 || Socorro || LINEAR || V || align=right | 1.4 km || 
|-id=549 bgcolor=#fefefe
| 98549 ||  || — || November 3, 2000 || Socorro || LINEAR || NYS || align=right | 1.2 km || 
|-id=550 bgcolor=#E9E9E9
| 98550 ||  || — || November 1, 2000 || Socorro || LINEAR || — || align=right | 3.0 km || 
|-id=551 bgcolor=#E9E9E9
| 98551 ||  || — || November 18, 2000 || Prescott || P. G. Comba || — || align=right | 2.4 km || 
|-id=552 bgcolor=#E9E9E9
| 98552 ||  || — || November 19, 2000 || Socorro || LINEAR || — || align=right | 2.3 km || 
|-id=553 bgcolor=#fefefe
| 98553 ||  || — || November 18, 2000 || Anderson Mesa || LONEOS || — || align=right | 1.5 km || 
|-id=554 bgcolor=#FA8072
| 98554 ||  || — || November 18, 2000 || Socorro || LINEAR || — || align=right | 1.6 km || 
|-id=555 bgcolor=#E9E9E9
| 98555 ||  || — || November 19, 2000 || Socorro || LINEAR || — || align=right | 5.8 km || 
|-id=556 bgcolor=#fefefe
| 98556 ||  || — || November 20, 2000 || Socorro || LINEAR || — || align=right | 1.7 km || 
|-id=557 bgcolor=#fefefe
| 98557 ||  || — || November 20, 2000 || Socorro || LINEAR || — || align=right | 1.6 km || 
|-id=558 bgcolor=#fefefe
| 98558 ||  || — || November 22, 2000 || Bisei SG Center || BATTeRS || NYS || align=right | 1.5 km || 
|-id=559 bgcolor=#fefefe
| 98559 ||  || — || November 22, 2000 || Haleakala || NEAT || — || align=right | 2.2 km || 
|-id=560 bgcolor=#E9E9E9
| 98560 ||  || — || November 24, 2000 || Elmira || A. J. Cecce || EUN || align=right | 2.2 km || 
|-id=561 bgcolor=#E9E9E9
| 98561 ||  || — || November 20, 2000 || Socorro || LINEAR || — || align=right | 4.3 km || 
|-id=562 bgcolor=#E9E9E9
| 98562 ||  || — || November 20, 2000 || Socorro || LINEAR || — || align=right | 2.6 km || 
|-id=563 bgcolor=#E9E9E9
| 98563 ||  || — || November 21, 2000 || Socorro || LINEAR || — || align=right | 3.6 km || 
|-id=564 bgcolor=#E9E9E9
| 98564 ||  || — || November 21, 2000 || Socorro || LINEAR || KON || align=right | 5.4 km || 
|-id=565 bgcolor=#fefefe
| 98565 ||  || — || November 21, 2000 || Socorro || LINEAR || NYS || align=right | 1.3 km || 
|-id=566 bgcolor=#fefefe
| 98566 ||  || — || November 21, 2000 || Socorro || LINEAR || — || align=right | 2.0 km || 
|-id=567 bgcolor=#fefefe
| 98567 ||  || — || November 25, 2000 || Fountain Hills || C. W. Juels || — || align=right | 2.5 km || 
|-id=568 bgcolor=#fefefe
| 98568 ||  || — || November 23, 2000 || Kitt Peak || Spacewatch || — || align=right | 2.2 km || 
|-id=569 bgcolor=#fefefe
| 98569 ||  || — || November 25, 2000 || Kitt Peak || Spacewatch || V || align=right | 1.3 km || 
|-id=570 bgcolor=#fefefe
| 98570 ||  || — || November 20, 2000 || Socorro || LINEAR || V || align=right | 1.4 km || 
|-id=571 bgcolor=#E9E9E9
| 98571 ||  || — || November 20, 2000 || Socorro || LINEAR || MIT || align=right | 6.8 km || 
|-id=572 bgcolor=#fefefe
| 98572 ||  || — || November 20, 2000 || Socorro || LINEAR || — || align=right | 3.7 km || 
|-id=573 bgcolor=#fefefe
| 98573 ||  || — || November 20, 2000 || Socorro || LINEAR || — || align=right | 2.0 km || 
|-id=574 bgcolor=#E9E9E9
| 98574 ||  || — || November 20, 2000 || Socorro || LINEAR || EUN || align=right | 2.4 km || 
|-id=575 bgcolor=#E9E9E9
| 98575 ||  || — || November 20, 2000 || Socorro || LINEAR || — || align=right | 3.3 km || 
|-id=576 bgcolor=#fefefe
| 98576 ||  || — || November 20, 2000 || Socorro || LINEAR || — || align=right | 1.5 km || 
|-id=577 bgcolor=#E9E9E9
| 98577 ||  || — || November 20, 2000 || Socorro || LINEAR || MAR || align=right | 3.3 km || 
|-id=578 bgcolor=#fefefe
| 98578 ||  || — || November 20, 2000 || Socorro || LINEAR || V || align=right | 1.5 km || 
|-id=579 bgcolor=#fefefe
| 98579 ||  || — || November 20, 2000 || Socorro || LINEAR || V || align=right | 1.3 km || 
|-id=580 bgcolor=#fefefe
| 98580 ||  || — || November 20, 2000 || Socorro || LINEAR || — || align=right | 2.0 km || 
|-id=581 bgcolor=#E9E9E9
| 98581 ||  || — || November 20, 2000 || Socorro || LINEAR || — || align=right | 7.7 km || 
|-id=582 bgcolor=#fefefe
| 98582 ||  || — || November 20, 2000 || Socorro || LINEAR || MAS || align=right | 2.0 km || 
|-id=583 bgcolor=#fefefe
| 98583 ||  || — || November 21, 2000 || Socorro || LINEAR || — || align=right | 1.7 km || 
|-id=584 bgcolor=#fefefe
| 98584 ||  || — || November 21, 2000 || Socorro || LINEAR || — || align=right | 1.2 km || 
|-id=585 bgcolor=#E9E9E9
| 98585 ||  || — || November 21, 2000 || Socorro || LINEAR || — || align=right | 3.7 km || 
|-id=586 bgcolor=#E9E9E9
| 98586 ||  || — || November 21, 2000 || Socorro || LINEAR || — || align=right | 5.8 km || 
|-id=587 bgcolor=#E9E9E9
| 98587 ||  || — || November 26, 2000 || Socorro || LINEAR || MIS || align=right | 4.4 km || 
|-id=588 bgcolor=#fefefe
| 98588 ||  || — || November 26, 2000 || Socorro || LINEAR || — || align=right | 2.1 km || 
|-id=589 bgcolor=#E9E9E9
| 98589 ||  || — || November 20, 2000 || Socorro || LINEAR || — || align=right | 3.6 km || 
|-id=590 bgcolor=#fefefe
| 98590 ||  || — || November 20, 2000 || Socorro || LINEAR || — || align=right | 2.6 km || 
|-id=591 bgcolor=#fefefe
| 98591 ||  || — || November 20, 2000 || Socorro || LINEAR || V || align=right | 2.8 km || 
|-id=592 bgcolor=#E9E9E9
| 98592 ||  || — || November 20, 2000 || Socorro || LINEAR || — || align=right | 5.6 km || 
|-id=593 bgcolor=#E9E9E9
| 98593 ||  || — || November 20, 2000 || Socorro || LINEAR || EUN || align=right | 2.8 km || 
|-id=594 bgcolor=#E9E9E9
| 98594 ||  || — || November 20, 2000 || Socorro || LINEAR || — || align=right | 2.7 km || 
|-id=595 bgcolor=#fefefe
| 98595 ||  || — || November 21, 2000 || Socorro || LINEAR || NYS || align=right | 1.7 km || 
|-id=596 bgcolor=#fefefe
| 98596 ||  || — || November 21, 2000 || Socorro || LINEAR || V || align=right | 1.5 km || 
|-id=597 bgcolor=#E9E9E9
| 98597 ||  || — || November 21, 2000 || Socorro || LINEAR || — || align=right | 2.2 km || 
|-id=598 bgcolor=#E9E9E9
| 98598 ||  || — || November 21, 2000 || Socorro || LINEAR || — || align=right | 2.2 km || 
|-id=599 bgcolor=#fefefe
| 98599 ||  || — || November 21, 2000 || Socorro || LINEAR || V || align=right | 2.8 km || 
|-id=600 bgcolor=#fefefe
| 98600 ||  || — || November 28, 2000 || Haleakala || NEAT || PHO || align=right | 3.6 km || 
|}

98601–98700 

|-bgcolor=#E9E9E9
| 98601 ||  || — || November 20, 2000 || Socorro || LINEAR || BRU || align=right | 7.6 km || 
|-id=602 bgcolor=#fefefe
| 98602 ||  || — || November 19, 2000 || Socorro || LINEAR || V || align=right | 1.7 km || 
|-id=603 bgcolor=#fefefe
| 98603 ||  || — || November 19, 2000 || Socorro || LINEAR || V || align=right | 1.7 km || 
|-id=604 bgcolor=#fefefe
| 98604 ||  || — || November 19, 2000 || Socorro || LINEAR || V || align=right | 1.6 km || 
|-id=605 bgcolor=#fefefe
| 98605 ||  || — || November 19, 2000 || Socorro || LINEAR || V || align=right | 1.5 km || 
|-id=606 bgcolor=#fefefe
| 98606 ||  || — || November 19, 2000 || Socorro || LINEAR || V || align=right | 1.6 km || 
|-id=607 bgcolor=#fefefe
| 98607 ||  || — || November 20, 2000 || Socorro || LINEAR || — || align=right | 1.9 km || 
|-id=608 bgcolor=#fefefe
| 98608 ||  || — || November 20, 2000 || Socorro || LINEAR || — || align=right | 1.4 km || 
|-id=609 bgcolor=#fefefe
| 98609 ||  || — || November 20, 2000 || Socorro || LINEAR || V || align=right | 1.3 km || 
|-id=610 bgcolor=#fefefe
| 98610 ||  || — || November 20, 2000 || Socorro || LINEAR || V || align=right | 1.8 km || 
|-id=611 bgcolor=#fefefe
| 98611 ||  || — || November 20, 2000 || Socorro || LINEAR || FLO || align=right | 1.3 km || 
|-id=612 bgcolor=#E9E9E9
| 98612 ||  || — || November 20, 2000 || Socorro || LINEAR || — || align=right | 2.1 km || 
|-id=613 bgcolor=#fefefe
| 98613 ||  || — || November 20, 2000 || Socorro || LINEAR || FLO || align=right | 2.2 km || 
|-id=614 bgcolor=#E9E9E9
| 98614 ||  || — || November 20, 2000 || Socorro || LINEAR || — || align=right | 4.8 km || 
|-id=615 bgcolor=#E9E9E9
| 98615 ||  || — || November 20, 2000 || Socorro || LINEAR || — || align=right | 4.5 km || 
|-id=616 bgcolor=#E9E9E9
| 98616 ||  || — || November 20, 2000 || Socorro || LINEAR || — || align=right | 2.1 km || 
|-id=617 bgcolor=#E9E9E9
| 98617 ||  || — || November 20, 2000 || Socorro || LINEAR || — || align=right | 2.6 km || 
|-id=618 bgcolor=#fefefe
| 98618 ||  || — || November 20, 2000 || Socorro || LINEAR || V || align=right | 1.4 km || 
|-id=619 bgcolor=#fefefe
| 98619 ||  || — || November 20, 2000 || Socorro || LINEAR || — || align=right | 2.1 km || 
|-id=620 bgcolor=#fefefe
| 98620 ||  || — || November 20, 2000 || Socorro || LINEAR || NYS || align=right | 1.4 km || 
|-id=621 bgcolor=#fefefe
| 98621 ||  || — || November 20, 2000 || Socorro || LINEAR || — || align=right | 3.4 km || 
|-id=622 bgcolor=#fefefe
| 98622 ||  || — || November 21, 2000 || Socorro || LINEAR || MAS || align=right | 1.9 km || 
|-id=623 bgcolor=#E9E9E9
| 98623 ||  || — || November 21, 2000 || Socorro || LINEAR || — || align=right | 5.0 km || 
|-id=624 bgcolor=#E9E9E9
| 98624 ||  || — || November 21, 2000 || Socorro || LINEAR || — || align=right | 5.4 km || 
|-id=625 bgcolor=#E9E9E9
| 98625 ||  || — || November 21, 2000 || Socorro || LINEAR || — || align=right | 1.6 km || 
|-id=626 bgcolor=#E9E9E9
| 98626 ||  || — || November 21, 2000 || Socorro || LINEAR || — || align=right | 2.6 km || 
|-id=627 bgcolor=#E9E9E9
| 98627 ||  || — || November 21, 2000 || Socorro || LINEAR || — || align=right | 2.2 km || 
|-id=628 bgcolor=#E9E9E9
| 98628 ||  || — || November 21, 2000 || Socorro || LINEAR || — || align=right | 2.3 km || 
|-id=629 bgcolor=#d6d6d6
| 98629 ||  || — || November 21, 2000 || Socorro || LINEAR || — || align=right | 5.2 km || 
|-id=630 bgcolor=#E9E9E9
| 98630 ||  || — || November 21, 2000 || Socorro || LINEAR || — || align=right | 2.3 km || 
|-id=631 bgcolor=#E9E9E9
| 98631 ||  || — || November 21, 2000 || Socorro || LINEAR || — || align=right | 3.9 km || 
|-id=632 bgcolor=#fefefe
| 98632 ||  || — || November 27, 2000 || Socorro || LINEAR || V || align=right | 1.5 km || 
|-id=633 bgcolor=#fefefe
| 98633 ||  || — || November 20, 2000 || Socorro || LINEAR || V || align=right | 1.4 km || 
|-id=634 bgcolor=#E9E9E9
| 98634 ||  || — || November 20, 2000 || Socorro || LINEAR || — || align=right | 5.1 km || 
|-id=635 bgcolor=#E9E9E9
| 98635 ||  || — || November 20, 2000 || Socorro || LINEAR || — || align=right | 2.4 km || 
|-id=636 bgcolor=#E9E9E9
| 98636 ||  || — || November 20, 2000 || Socorro || LINEAR || — || align=right | 2.4 km || 
|-id=637 bgcolor=#fefefe
| 98637 ||  || — || November 20, 2000 || Socorro || LINEAR || — || align=right | 1.8 km || 
|-id=638 bgcolor=#fefefe
| 98638 ||  || — || November 20, 2000 || Socorro || LINEAR || — || align=right | 2.0 km || 
|-id=639 bgcolor=#fefefe
| 98639 ||  || — || November 20, 2000 || Socorro || LINEAR || V || align=right | 1.7 km || 
|-id=640 bgcolor=#E9E9E9
| 98640 ||  || — || November 21, 2000 || Socorro || LINEAR || — || align=right | 1.9 km || 
|-id=641 bgcolor=#fefefe
| 98641 ||  || — || November 29, 2000 || Socorro || LINEAR || — || align=right | 3.1 km || 
|-id=642 bgcolor=#E9E9E9
| 98642 ||  || — || November 28, 2000 || Kitt Peak || Spacewatch || MIS || align=right | 5.0 km || 
|-id=643 bgcolor=#E9E9E9
| 98643 ||  || — || November 30, 2000 || Socorro || LINEAR || — || align=right | 2.0 km || 
|-id=644 bgcolor=#fefefe
| 98644 ||  || — || November 30, 2000 || Socorro || LINEAR || — || align=right | 2.1 km || 
|-id=645 bgcolor=#fefefe
| 98645 ||  || — || November 19, 2000 || Kitt Peak || Spacewatch || — || align=right | 2.5 km || 
|-id=646 bgcolor=#fefefe
| 98646 ||  || — || November 19, 2000 || Socorro || LINEAR || V || align=right | 1.4 km || 
|-id=647 bgcolor=#E9E9E9
| 98647 ||  || — || November 30, 2000 || Socorro || LINEAR || — || align=right | 6.4 km || 
|-id=648 bgcolor=#E9E9E9
| 98648 ||  || — || November 19, 2000 || Socorro || LINEAR || ADE || align=right | 3.9 km || 
|-id=649 bgcolor=#E9E9E9
| 98649 ||  || — || November 21, 2000 || Socorro || LINEAR || — || align=right | 2.0 km || 
|-id=650 bgcolor=#fefefe
| 98650 ||  || — || November 21, 2000 || Socorro || LINEAR || V || align=right | 1.7 km || 
|-id=651 bgcolor=#E9E9E9
| 98651 ||  || — || November 20, 2000 || Socorro || LINEAR || — || align=right | 2.4 km || 
|-id=652 bgcolor=#E9E9E9
| 98652 ||  || — || November 20, 2000 || Socorro || LINEAR || — || align=right | 2.4 km || 
|-id=653 bgcolor=#E9E9E9
| 98653 ||  || — || November 21, 2000 || Socorro || LINEAR || — || align=right | 3.6 km || 
|-id=654 bgcolor=#fefefe
| 98654 ||  || — || November 23, 2000 || Haleakala || NEAT || — || align=right | 1.6 km || 
|-id=655 bgcolor=#E9E9E9
| 98655 ||  || — || November 28, 2000 || Haleakala || NEAT || — || align=right | 4.7 km || 
|-id=656 bgcolor=#E9E9E9
| 98656 ||  || — || November 29, 2000 || Haleakala || NEAT || — || align=right | 2.9 km || 
|-id=657 bgcolor=#E9E9E9
| 98657 ||  || — || November 29, 2000 || Haleakala || NEAT || — || align=right | 2.7 km || 
|-id=658 bgcolor=#E9E9E9
| 98658 ||  || — || November 29, 2000 || Socorro || LINEAR || — || align=right | 3.6 km || 
|-id=659 bgcolor=#fefefe
| 98659 ||  || — || November 30, 2000 || Socorro || LINEAR || V || align=right | 1.5 km || 
|-id=660 bgcolor=#fefefe
| 98660 ||  || — || November 30, 2000 || Socorro || LINEAR || V || align=right | 1.7 km || 
|-id=661 bgcolor=#fefefe
| 98661 ||  || — || November 30, 2000 || Socorro || LINEAR || — || align=right | 3.0 km || 
|-id=662 bgcolor=#fefefe
| 98662 ||  || — || November 30, 2000 || Socorro || LINEAR || V || align=right | 1.5 km || 
|-id=663 bgcolor=#fefefe
| 98663 ||  || — || November 30, 2000 || Socorro || LINEAR || V || align=right | 1.5 km || 
|-id=664 bgcolor=#fefefe
| 98664 ||  || — || November 30, 2000 || Haleakala || NEAT || — || align=right | 2.8 km || 
|-id=665 bgcolor=#fefefe
| 98665 ||  || — || November 19, 2000 || Socorro || LINEAR || — || align=right | 3.3 km || 
|-id=666 bgcolor=#E9E9E9
| 98666 ||  || — || November 20, 2000 || Anderson Mesa || LONEOS || — || align=right | 4.7 km || 
|-id=667 bgcolor=#fefefe
| 98667 ||  || — || November 20, 2000 || Socorro || LINEAR || — || align=right | 2.3 km || 
|-id=668 bgcolor=#E9E9E9
| 98668 ||  || — || November 21, 2000 || Socorro || LINEAR || — || align=right | 1.5 km || 
|-id=669 bgcolor=#fefefe
| 98669 ||  || — || November 22, 2000 || Haleakala || NEAT || — || align=right | 3.9 km || 
|-id=670 bgcolor=#fefefe
| 98670 ||  || — || November 22, 2000 || Haleakala || NEAT || — || align=right | 2.2 km || 
|-id=671 bgcolor=#E9E9E9
| 98671 ||  || — || November 23, 2000 || Haleakala || NEAT || EUN || align=right | 3.7 km || 
|-id=672 bgcolor=#fefefe
| 98672 ||  || — || November 24, 2000 || Anderson Mesa || LONEOS || — || align=right | 2.3 km || 
|-id=673 bgcolor=#d6d6d6
| 98673 ||  || — || November 24, 2000 || Anderson Mesa || LONEOS || — || align=right | 6.3 km || 
|-id=674 bgcolor=#E9E9E9
| 98674 ||  || — || November 25, 2000 || Anderson Mesa || LONEOS || — || align=right | 2.1 km || 
|-id=675 bgcolor=#E9E9E9
| 98675 ||  || — || November 25, 2000 || Anderson Mesa || LONEOS || GEF || align=right | 2.8 km || 
|-id=676 bgcolor=#E9E9E9
| 98676 ||  || — || November 26, 2000 || Socorro || LINEAR || — || align=right | 2.2 km || 
|-id=677 bgcolor=#E9E9E9
| 98677 ||  || — || November 25, 2000 || Anderson Mesa || LONEOS || — || align=right | 4.5 km || 
|-id=678 bgcolor=#E9E9E9
| 98678 ||  || — || November 25, 2000 || Anderson Mesa || LONEOS || — || align=right | 3.7 km || 
|-id=679 bgcolor=#E9E9E9
| 98679 ||  || — || November 27, 2000 || Socorro || LINEAR || MIS || align=right | 5.2 km || 
|-id=680 bgcolor=#fefefe
| 98680 ||  || — || November 28, 2000 || Kitt Peak || Spacewatch || MAS || align=right | 1.6 km || 
|-id=681 bgcolor=#fefefe
| 98681 ||  || — || November 29, 2000 || Socorro || LINEAR || NYS || align=right | 1.9 km || 
|-id=682 bgcolor=#fefefe
| 98682 ||  || — || November 29, 2000 || Anderson Mesa || LONEOS || — || align=right | 3.8 km || 
|-id=683 bgcolor=#fefefe
| 98683 ||  || — || November 29, 2000 || Socorro || LINEAR || V || align=right | 1.5 km || 
|-id=684 bgcolor=#E9E9E9
| 98684 ||  || — || November 18, 2000 || Anderson Mesa || LONEOS || — || align=right | 5.9 km || 
|-id=685 bgcolor=#fefefe
| 98685 ||  || — || November 20, 2000 || Socorro || LINEAR || NYS || align=right | 1.5 km || 
|-id=686 bgcolor=#fefefe
| 98686 ||  || — || December 1, 2000 || Socorro || LINEAR || — || align=right | 2.2 km || 
|-id=687 bgcolor=#fefefe
| 98687 ||  || — || December 1, 2000 || Socorro || LINEAR || — || align=right | 3.4 km || 
|-id=688 bgcolor=#E9E9E9
| 98688 ||  || — || December 1, 2000 || Socorro || LINEAR || — || align=right | 3.3 km || 
|-id=689 bgcolor=#E9E9E9
| 98689 ||  || — || December 1, 2000 || Socorro || LINEAR || EUN || align=right | 3.1 km || 
|-id=690 bgcolor=#E9E9E9
| 98690 ||  || — || December 1, 2000 || Socorro || LINEAR || — || align=right | 3.0 km || 
|-id=691 bgcolor=#fefefe
| 98691 ||  || — || December 5, 2000 || Bisei SG Center || BATTeRS || — || align=right | 3.4 km || 
|-id=692 bgcolor=#fefefe
| 98692 ||  || — || December 2, 2000 || Haleakala || NEAT || PHO || align=right | 2.6 km || 
|-id=693 bgcolor=#fefefe
| 98693 ||  || — || December 1, 2000 || Socorro || LINEAR || V || align=right | 1.2 km || 
|-id=694 bgcolor=#fefefe
| 98694 ||  || — || December 4, 2000 || Socorro || LINEAR || V || align=right | 1.4 km || 
|-id=695 bgcolor=#E9E9E9
| 98695 ||  || — || December 4, 2000 || Socorro || LINEAR || — || align=right | 2.9 km || 
|-id=696 bgcolor=#fefefe
| 98696 ||  || — || December 4, 2000 || Socorro || LINEAR || V || align=right | 1.4 km || 
|-id=697 bgcolor=#E9E9E9
| 98697 ||  || — || December 4, 2000 || Socorro || LINEAR || — || align=right | 2.4 km || 
|-id=698 bgcolor=#fefefe
| 98698 ||  || — || December 4, 2000 || Socorro || LINEAR || — || align=right | 2.2 km || 
|-id=699 bgcolor=#E9E9E9
| 98699 ||  || — || December 4, 2000 || Socorro || LINEAR || EUN || align=right | 3.3 km || 
|-id=700 bgcolor=#fefefe
| 98700 ||  || — || December 4, 2000 || Socorro || LINEAR || — || align=right | 3.3 km || 
|}

98701–98800 

|-bgcolor=#fefefe
| 98701 ||  || — || December 4, 2000 || Socorro || LINEAR || V || align=right | 1.6 km || 
|-id=702 bgcolor=#E9E9E9
| 98702 ||  || — || December 4, 2000 || Socorro || LINEAR || — || align=right | 3.7 km || 
|-id=703 bgcolor=#d6d6d6
| 98703 ||  || — || December 4, 2000 || Socorro || LINEAR || — || align=right | 8.0 km || 
|-id=704 bgcolor=#E9E9E9
| 98704 ||  || — || December 4, 2000 || Socorro || LINEAR || — || align=right | 3.4 km || 
|-id=705 bgcolor=#fefefe
| 98705 ||  || — || December 5, 2000 || Socorro || LINEAR || V || align=right | 2.1 km || 
|-id=706 bgcolor=#fefefe
| 98706 ||  || — || December 5, 2000 || Socorro || LINEAR || — || align=right | 6.0 km || 
|-id=707 bgcolor=#E9E9E9
| 98707 ||  || — || December 5, 2000 || Socorro || LINEAR || — || align=right | 3.0 km || 
|-id=708 bgcolor=#E9E9E9
| 98708 ||  || — || December 5, 2000 || Socorro || LINEAR || — || align=right | 8.6 km || 
|-id=709 bgcolor=#E9E9E9
| 98709 ||  || — || December 5, 2000 || Socorro || LINEAR || — || align=right | 5.3 km || 
|-id=710 bgcolor=#E9E9E9
| 98710 ||  || — || December 5, 2000 || Socorro || LINEAR || BRU || align=right | 4.1 km || 
|-id=711 bgcolor=#E9E9E9
| 98711 ||  || — || December 5, 2000 || Socorro || LINEAR || — || align=right | 2.7 km || 
|-id=712 bgcolor=#E9E9E9
| 98712 ||  || — || December 5, 2000 || Socorro || LINEAR || — || align=right | 3.9 km || 
|-id=713 bgcolor=#E9E9E9
| 98713 ||  || — || December 5, 2000 || Socorro || LINEAR || KAZ || align=right | 3.4 km || 
|-id=714 bgcolor=#fefefe
| 98714 ||  || — || December 4, 2000 || Socorro || LINEAR || V || align=right | 1.6 km || 
|-id=715 bgcolor=#d6d6d6
| 98715 ||  || — || December 4, 2000 || Socorro || LINEAR || — || align=right | 8.7 km || 
|-id=716 bgcolor=#fefefe
| 98716 ||  || — || December 4, 2000 || Socorro || LINEAR || — || align=right | 2.6 km || 
|-id=717 bgcolor=#E9E9E9
| 98717 ||  || — || December 4, 2000 || Socorro || LINEAR || — || align=right | 3.0 km || 
|-id=718 bgcolor=#E9E9E9
| 98718 ||  || — || December 4, 2000 || Socorro || LINEAR || MIT || align=right | 5.6 km || 
|-id=719 bgcolor=#d6d6d6
| 98719 ||  || — || December 6, 2000 || Socorro || LINEAR || EOS || align=right | 4.8 km || 
|-id=720 bgcolor=#E9E9E9
| 98720 ||  || — || December 5, 2000 || Socorro || LINEAR || MAR || align=right | 2.9 km || 
|-id=721 bgcolor=#fefefe
| 98721 ||  || — || December 19, 2000 || Socorro || LINEAR || V || align=right | 2.5 km || 
|-id=722 bgcolor=#E9E9E9
| 98722 Elenaumberto ||  ||  || December 22, 2000 || Ceccano || G. Masi || EUN || align=right | 2.6 km || 
|-id=723 bgcolor=#E9E9E9
| 98723 ||  || — || December 22, 2000 || Haleakala || NEAT || EUN || align=right | 2.5 km || 
|-id=724 bgcolor=#E9E9E9
| 98724 ||  || — || December 23, 2000 || Kitt Peak || Spacewatch || — || align=right | 3.3 km || 
|-id=725 bgcolor=#E9E9E9
| 98725 ||  || — || December 23, 2000 || Kleť || Kleť Obs. || — || align=right | 2.2 km || 
|-id=726 bgcolor=#fefefe
| 98726 ||  || — || December 22, 2000 || Anderson Mesa || LONEOS || — || align=right | 2.1 km || 
|-id=727 bgcolor=#fefefe
| 98727 ||  || — || December 26, 2000 || Kleť || Kleť Obs. || NYS || align=right | 1.8 km || 
|-id=728 bgcolor=#E9E9E9
| 98728 ||  || — || December 29, 2000 || Desert Beaver || W. K. Y. Yeung || — || align=right | 3.4 km || 
|-id=729 bgcolor=#E9E9E9
| 98729 ||  || — || December 22, 2000 || Socorro || LINEAR || — || align=right | 4.8 km || 
|-id=730 bgcolor=#E9E9E9
| 98730 ||  || — || December 28, 2000 || Socorro || LINEAR || — || align=right | 4.0 km || 
|-id=731 bgcolor=#E9E9E9
| 98731 ||  || — || December 29, 2000 || Haleakala || NEAT || RAF || align=right | 2.2 km || 
|-id=732 bgcolor=#E9E9E9
| 98732 ||  || — || December 22, 2000 || Needville || Needville Obs. || — || align=right | 2.1 km || 
|-id=733 bgcolor=#E9E9E9
| 98733 ||  || — || December 29, 2000 || Needville || Needville Obs. || HNS || align=right | 3.0 km || 
|-id=734 bgcolor=#fefefe
| 98734 ||  || — || December 30, 2000 || Desert Beaver || W. K. Y. Yeung || NYS || align=right | 1.6 km || 
|-id=735 bgcolor=#E9E9E9
| 98735 ||  || — || December 28, 2000 || Socorro || LINEAR || MIT || align=right | 3.5 km || 
|-id=736 bgcolor=#fefefe
| 98736 ||  || — || December 30, 2000 || Socorro || LINEAR || NYS || align=right | 1.7 km || 
|-id=737 bgcolor=#fefefe
| 98737 ||  || — || December 30, 2000 || Socorro || LINEAR || — || align=right | 2.7 km || 
|-id=738 bgcolor=#E9E9E9
| 98738 ||  || — || December 30, 2000 || Socorro || LINEAR || — || align=right | 4.9 km || 
|-id=739 bgcolor=#fefefe
| 98739 ||  || — || December 30, 2000 || Socorro || LINEAR || NYS || align=right | 1.8 km || 
|-id=740 bgcolor=#E9E9E9
| 98740 ||  || — || December 30, 2000 || Socorro || LINEAR || — || align=right | 2.8 km || 
|-id=741 bgcolor=#fefefe
| 98741 ||  || — || December 30, 2000 || Socorro || LINEAR || NYS || align=right | 1.9 km || 
|-id=742 bgcolor=#fefefe
| 98742 ||  || — || December 30, 2000 || Socorro || LINEAR || — || align=right | 1.8 km || 
|-id=743 bgcolor=#fefefe
| 98743 ||  || — || December 30, 2000 || Socorro || LINEAR || NYS || align=right | 2.2 km || 
|-id=744 bgcolor=#E9E9E9
| 98744 ||  || — || December 30, 2000 || Socorro || LINEAR || — || align=right | 3.2 km || 
|-id=745 bgcolor=#fefefe
| 98745 ||  || — || December 30, 2000 || Socorro || LINEAR || — || align=right | 2.7 km || 
|-id=746 bgcolor=#E9E9E9
| 98746 ||  || — || December 30, 2000 || Socorro || LINEAR || — || align=right | 2.9 km || 
|-id=747 bgcolor=#fefefe
| 98747 ||  || — || December 30, 2000 || Socorro || LINEAR || — || align=right | 2.2 km || 
|-id=748 bgcolor=#fefefe
| 98748 ||  || — || December 30, 2000 || Socorro || LINEAR || NYS || align=right | 1.3 km || 
|-id=749 bgcolor=#fefefe
| 98749 ||  || — || December 30, 2000 || Socorro || LINEAR || V || align=right | 1.8 km || 
|-id=750 bgcolor=#E9E9E9
| 98750 ||  || — || December 30, 2000 || Socorro || LINEAR || — || align=right | 1.9 km || 
|-id=751 bgcolor=#E9E9E9
| 98751 ||  || — || December 30, 2000 || Socorro || LINEAR || — || align=right | 2.9 km || 
|-id=752 bgcolor=#E9E9E9
| 98752 ||  || — || December 30, 2000 || Socorro || LINEAR || — || align=right | 2.1 km || 
|-id=753 bgcolor=#fefefe
| 98753 ||  || — || December 30, 2000 || Socorro || LINEAR || — || align=right | 3.2 km || 
|-id=754 bgcolor=#fefefe
| 98754 ||  || — || December 30, 2000 || Socorro || LINEAR || — || align=right | 2.0 km || 
|-id=755 bgcolor=#d6d6d6
| 98755 ||  || — || December 30, 2000 || Socorro || LINEAR || — || align=right | 3.6 km || 
|-id=756 bgcolor=#E9E9E9
| 98756 ||  || — || December 30, 2000 || Socorro || LINEAR || — || align=right | 2.2 km || 
|-id=757 bgcolor=#E9E9E9
| 98757 ||  || — || December 30, 2000 || Socorro || LINEAR || — || align=right | 5.2 km || 
|-id=758 bgcolor=#E9E9E9
| 98758 ||  || — || December 30, 2000 || Socorro || LINEAR || DOR || align=right | 5.4 km || 
|-id=759 bgcolor=#d6d6d6
| 98759 ||  || — || December 28, 2000 || Socorro || LINEAR || — || align=right | 7.8 km || 
|-id=760 bgcolor=#E9E9E9
| 98760 ||  || — || December 28, 2000 || Socorro || LINEAR || — || align=right | 2.6 km || 
|-id=761 bgcolor=#E9E9E9
| 98761 ||  || — || December 28, 2000 || Socorro || LINEAR || — || align=right | 3.7 km || 
|-id=762 bgcolor=#E9E9E9
| 98762 ||  || — || December 28, 2000 || Socorro || LINEAR || — || align=right | 2.0 km || 
|-id=763 bgcolor=#E9E9E9
| 98763 ||  || — || December 30, 2000 || Socorro || LINEAR || — || align=right | 2.6 km || 
|-id=764 bgcolor=#fefefe
| 98764 ||  || — || December 30, 2000 || Socorro || LINEAR || — || align=right | 2.1 km || 
|-id=765 bgcolor=#fefefe
| 98765 ||  || — || December 30, 2000 || Socorro || LINEAR || — || align=right | 2.0 km || 
|-id=766 bgcolor=#E9E9E9
| 98766 ||  || — || December 30, 2000 || Socorro || LINEAR || — || align=right | 2.2 km || 
|-id=767 bgcolor=#fefefe
| 98767 ||  || — || December 30, 2000 || Socorro || LINEAR || MAS || align=right | 1.9 km || 
|-id=768 bgcolor=#E9E9E9
| 98768 ||  || — || December 30, 2000 || Socorro || LINEAR || — || align=right | 3.4 km || 
|-id=769 bgcolor=#fefefe
| 98769 ||  || — || December 30, 2000 || Socorro || LINEAR || — || align=right | 1.8 km || 
|-id=770 bgcolor=#fefefe
| 98770 ||  || — || December 30, 2000 || Socorro || LINEAR || — || align=right | 1.7 km || 
|-id=771 bgcolor=#fefefe
| 98771 ||  || — || December 30, 2000 || Socorro || LINEAR || NYS || align=right | 1.3 km || 
|-id=772 bgcolor=#fefefe
| 98772 ||  || — || December 30, 2000 || Socorro || LINEAR || NYS || align=right | 1.7 km || 
|-id=773 bgcolor=#E9E9E9
| 98773 ||  || — || December 30, 2000 || Socorro || LINEAR || — || align=right | 2.5 km || 
|-id=774 bgcolor=#E9E9E9
| 98774 ||  || — || December 30, 2000 || Socorro || LINEAR || — || align=right | 4.7 km || 
|-id=775 bgcolor=#E9E9E9
| 98775 ||  || — || December 30, 2000 || Socorro || LINEAR || — || align=right | 2.3 km || 
|-id=776 bgcolor=#E9E9E9
| 98776 ||  || — || December 30, 2000 || Socorro || LINEAR || — || align=right | 6.3 km || 
|-id=777 bgcolor=#E9E9E9
| 98777 ||  || — || December 30, 2000 || Socorro || LINEAR || MAR || align=right | 2.7 km || 
|-id=778 bgcolor=#E9E9E9
| 98778 ||  || — || December 30, 2000 || Socorro || LINEAR || — || align=right | 9.5 km || 
|-id=779 bgcolor=#E9E9E9
| 98779 ||  || — || December 30, 2000 || Socorro || LINEAR || — || align=right | 1.9 km || 
|-id=780 bgcolor=#E9E9E9
| 98780 ||  || — || December 30, 2000 || Socorro || LINEAR || — || align=right | 4.3 km || 
|-id=781 bgcolor=#fefefe
| 98781 ||  || — || December 30, 2000 || Socorro || LINEAR || MAS || align=right | 1.7 km || 
|-id=782 bgcolor=#E9E9E9
| 98782 ||  || — || December 30, 2000 || Socorro || LINEAR || — || align=right | 1.8 km || 
|-id=783 bgcolor=#fefefe
| 98783 ||  || — || December 30, 2000 || Socorro || LINEAR || NYS || align=right | 1.5 km || 
|-id=784 bgcolor=#E9E9E9
| 98784 ||  || — || December 30, 2000 || Socorro || LINEAR || — || align=right | 4.8 km || 
|-id=785 bgcolor=#E9E9E9
| 98785 ||  || — || December 30, 2000 || Socorro || LINEAR || — || align=right | 3.4 km || 
|-id=786 bgcolor=#E9E9E9
| 98786 ||  || — || December 30, 2000 || Socorro || LINEAR || — || align=right | 3.6 km || 
|-id=787 bgcolor=#E9E9E9
| 98787 ||  || — || December 30, 2000 || Socorro || LINEAR || EUN || align=right | 3.6 km || 
|-id=788 bgcolor=#E9E9E9
| 98788 ||  || — || December 30, 2000 || Socorro || LINEAR || — || align=right | 3.0 km || 
|-id=789 bgcolor=#E9E9E9
| 98789 ||  || — || December 30, 2000 || Socorro || LINEAR || MAR || align=right | 2.3 km || 
|-id=790 bgcolor=#fefefe
| 98790 ||  || — || December 30, 2000 || Socorro || LINEAR || NYS || align=right | 1.4 km || 
|-id=791 bgcolor=#E9E9E9
| 98791 ||  || — || December 28, 2000 || Socorro || LINEAR || — || align=right | 5.5 km || 
|-id=792 bgcolor=#d6d6d6
| 98792 ||  || — || December 28, 2000 || Socorro || LINEAR || — || align=right | 6.2 km || 
|-id=793 bgcolor=#E9E9E9
| 98793 ||  || — || December 30, 2000 || Socorro || LINEAR || — || align=right | 2.0 km || 
|-id=794 bgcolor=#fefefe
| 98794 ||  || — || December 30, 2000 || Socorro || LINEAR || V || align=right | 1.4 km || 
|-id=795 bgcolor=#E9E9E9
| 98795 ||  || — || December 30, 2000 || Socorro || LINEAR || — || align=right | 2.8 km || 
|-id=796 bgcolor=#fefefe
| 98796 ||  || — || December 30, 2000 || Socorro || LINEAR || — || align=right | 2.1 km || 
|-id=797 bgcolor=#fefefe
| 98797 ||  || — || December 30, 2000 || Socorro || LINEAR || NYS || align=right | 1.7 km || 
|-id=798 bgcolor=#E9E9E9
| 98798 ||  || — || December 30, 2000 || Socorro || LINEAR || — || align=right | 2.4 km || 
|-id=799 bgcolor=#fefefe
| 98799 ||  || — || December 30, 2000 || Socorro || LINEAR || NYS || align=right | 1.7 km || 
|-id=800 bgcolor=#E9E9E9
| 98800 ||  || — || December 30, 2000 || Socorro || LINEAR || — || align=right | 5.1 km || 
|}

98801–98900 

|-bgcolor=#E9E9E9
| 98801 ||  || — || December 30, 2000 || Socorro || LINEAR || — || align=right | 2.3 km || 
|-id=802 bgcolor=#E9E9E9
| 98802 ||  || — || December 30, 2000 || Socorro || LINEAR || — || align=right | 2.8 km || 
|-id=803 bgcolor=#E9E9E9
| 98803 ||  || — || December 30, 2000 || Socorro || LINEAR || — || align=right | 2.3 km || 
|-id=804 bgcolor=#E9E9E9
| 98804 ||  || — || December 30, 2000 || Socorro || LINEAR || — || align=right | 2.8 km || 
|-id=805 bgcolor=#d6d6d6
| 98805 ||  || — || December 30, 2000 || Socorro || LINEAR || EOS || align=right | 4.7 km || 
|-id=806 bgcolor=#fefefe
| 98806 ||  || — || December 30, 2000 || Socorro || LINEAR || — || align=right | 4.4 km || 
|-id=807 bgcolor=#E9E9E9
| 98807 ||  || — || December 30, 2000 || Socorro || LINEAR || — || align=right | 6.2 km || 
|-id=808 bgcolor=#E9E9E9
| 98808 ||  || — || December 28, 2000 || Socorro || LINEAR || — || align=right | 5.5 km || 
|-id=809 bgcolor=#E9E9E9
| 98809 ||  || — || December 31, 2000 || Anderson Mesa || LONEOS || — || align=right | 5.9 km || 
|-id=810 bgcolor=#E9E9E9
| 98810 ||  || — || December 17, 2000 || Kitt Peak || Spacewatch || — || align=right | 2.4 km || 
|-id=811 bgcolor=#E9E9E9
| 98811 ||  || — || December 17, 2000 || Kitt Peak || Spacewatch || — || align=right | 3.0 km || 
|-id=812 bgcolor=#E9E9E9
| 98812 ||  || — || December 19, 2000 || Socorro || LINEAR || — || align=right | 3.4 km || 
|-id=813 bgcolor=#E9E9E9
| 98813 ||  || — || December 20, 2000 || Socorro || LINEAR || — || align=right | 4.7 km || 
|-id=814 bgcolor=#fefefe
| 98814 ||  || — || December 28, 2000 || Kitt Peak || Spacewatch || V || align=right | 1.4 km || 
|-id=815 bgcolor=#fefefe
| 98815 ||  || — || December 28, 2000 || Kitt Peak || Spacewatch || — || align=right | 3.2 km || 
|-id=816 bgcolor=#E9E9E9
| 98816 ||  || — || December 28, 2000 || Kitt Peak || Spacewatch || — || align=right | 3.3 km || 
|-id=817 bgcolor=#E9E9E9
| 98817 ||  || — || December 29, 2000 || Anderson Mesa || LONEOS || — || align=right | 4.0 km || 
|-id=818 bgcolor=#fefefe
| 98818 ||  || — || December 29, 2000 || Anderson Mesa || LONEOS || CHL || align=right | 3.8 km || 
|-id=819 bgcolor=#E9E9E9
| 98819 ||  || — || December 29, 2000 || Haleakala || NEAT || — || align=right | 4.8 km || 
|-id=820 bgcolor=#E9E9E9
| 98820 ||  || — || December 30, 2000 || Socorro || LINEAR || — || align=right | 3.0 km || 
|-id=821 bgcolor=#E9E9E9
| 98821 ||  || — || December 30, 2000 || Socorro || LINEAR || — || align=right | 2.7 km || 
|-id=822 bgcolor=#E9E9E9
| 98822 ||  || — || December 30, 2000 || Anderson Mesa || LONEOS || — || align=right | 7.3 km || 
|-id=823 bgcolor=#E9E9E9
| 98823 ||  || — || December 17, 2000 || Anderson Mesa || LONEOS || — || align=right | 3.4 km || 
|-id=824 bgcolor=#E9E9E9
| 98824 ||  || — || December 20, 2000 || Kitt Peak || Spacewatch || — || align=right | 2.4 km || 
|-id=825 bgcolor=#E9E9E9
| 98825 Maryellen ||  ||  || December 27, 2000 || Kanab || E. E. Sheridan || — || align=right | 2.4 km || 
|-id=826 bgcolor=#E9E9E9
| 98826 ||  || — || December 31, 2000 || Anderson Mesa || LONEOS || MIT || align=right | 5.7 km || 
|-id=827 bgcolor=#d6d6d6
| 98827 || 2001 AW || — || January 1, 2001 || Kitt Peak || Spacewatch || THM || align=right | 4.3 km || 
|-id=828 bgcolor=#fefefe
| 98828 ||  || — || January 2, 2001 || Socorro || LINEAR || — || align=right | 3.8 km || 
|-id=829 bgcolor=#E9E9E9
| 98829 ||  || — || January 2, 2001 || Socorro || LINEAR || — || align=right | 2.9 km || 
|-id=830 bgcolor=#E9E9E9
| 98830 ||  || — || January 2, 2001 || Socorro || LINEAR || — || align=right | 3.7 km || 
|-id=831 bgcolor=#E9E9E9
| 98831 ||  || — || January 2, 2001 || Socorro || LINEAR || — || align=right | 1.7 km || 
|-id=832 bgcolor=#E9E9E9
| 98832 ||  || — || January 2, 2001 || Socorro || LINEAR || — || align=right | 2.5 km || 
|-id=833 bgcolor=#E9E9E9
| 98833 ||  || — || January 2, 2001 || Socorro || LINEAR || — || align=right | 3.0 km || 
|-id=834 bgcolor=#E9E9E9
| 98834 ||  || — || January 2, 2001 || Socorro || LINEAR || GEF || align=right | 2.4 km || 
|-id=835 bgcolor=#E9E9E9
| 98835 ||  || — || January 2, 2001 || Socorro || LINEAR || — || align=right | 3.0 km || 
|-id=836 bgcolor=#E9E9E9
| 98836 ||  || — || January 2, 2001 || Socorro || LINEAR || — || align=right | 2.7 km || 
|-id=837 bgcolor=#E9E9E9
| 98837 ||  || — || January 2, 2001 || Socorro || LINEAR || — || align=right | 3.2 km || 
|-id=838 bgcolor=#E9E9E9
| 98838 ||  || — || January 4, 2001 || Haleakala || NEAT || — || align=right | 2.9 km || 
|-id=839 bgcolor=#E9E9E9
| 98839 ||  || — || January 3, 2001 || Socorro || LINEAR || HNS || align=right | 2.9 km || 
|-id=840 bgcolor=#E9E9E9
| 98840 ||  || — || January 3, 2001 || Socorro || LINEAR || — || align=right | 3.1 km || 
|-id=841 bgcolor=#E9E9E9
| 98841 ||  || — || January 3, 2001 || Socorro || LINEAR || — || align=right | 2.5 km || 
|-id=842 bgcolor=#E9E9E9
| 98842 ||  || — || January 3, 2001 || Socorro || LINEAR || — || align=right | 4.6 km || 
|-id=843 bgcolor=#E9E9E9
| 98843 ||  || — || January 5, 2001 || Socorro || LINEAR || GER || align=right | 3.9 km || 
|-id=844 bgcolor=#E9E9E9
| 98844 ||  || — || January 5, 2001 || Socorro || LINEAR || GEF || align=right | 2.6 km || 
|-id=845 bgcolor=#fefefe
| 98845 ||  || — || January 5, 2001 || Socorro || LINEAR || — || align=right | 2.8 km || 
|-id=846 bgcolor=#E9E9E9
| 98846 ||  || — || January 5, 2001 || Socorro || LINEAR || — || align=right | 2.6 km || 
|-id=847 bgcolor=#E9E9E9
| 98847 ||  || — || January 4, 2001 || Socorro || LINEAR || PAD || align=right | 4.9 km || 
|-id=848 bgcolor=#E9E9E9
| 98848 ||  || — || January 4, 2001 || Socorro || LINEAR || — || align=right | 3.1 km || 
|-id=849 bgcolor=#fefefe
| 98849 ||  || — || January 4, 2001 || Socorro || LINEAR || V || align=right | 1.8 km || 
|-id=850 bgcolor=#fefefe
| 98850 ||  || — || January 4, 2001 || Socorro || LINEAR || — || align=right | 2.3 km || 
|-id=851 bgcolor=#E9E9E9
| 98851 ||  || — || January 4, 2001 || Socorro || LINEAR || — || align=right | 5.2 km || 
|-id=852 bgcolor=#E9E9E9
| 98852 ||  || — || January 4, 2001 || Socorro || LINEAR || PAD || align=right | 4.8 km || 
|-id=853 bgcolor=#E9E9E9
| 98853 ||  || — || January 4, 2001 || Socorro || LINEAR || — || align=right | 4.4 km || 
|-id=854 bgcolor=#E9E9E9
| 98854 ||  || — || January 5, 2001 || Socorro || LINEAR || — || align=right | 2.0 km || 
|-id=855 bgcolor=#E9E9E9
| 98855 ||  || — || January 5, 2001 || Socorro || LINEAR || EUN || align=right | 3.0 km || 
|-id=856 bgcolor=#d6d6d6
| 98856 ||  || — || January 5, 2001 || Socorro || LINEAR || FIR || align=right | 7.8 km || 
|-id=857 bgcolor=#E9E9E9
| 98857 ||  || — || January 5, 2001 || Socorro || LINEAR || — || align=right | 3.0 km || 
|-id=858 bgcolor=#E9E9E9
| 98858 ||  || — || January 3, 2001 || Socorro || LINEAR || EUN || align=right | 2.4 km || 
|-id=859 bgcolor=#fefefe
| 98859 ||  || — || January 3, 2001 || Socorro || LINEAR || — || align=right | 2.7 km || 
|-id=860 bgcolor=#E9E9E9
| 98860 ||  || — || January 4, 2001 || Socorro || LINEAR || MAR || align=right | 2.6 km || 
|-id=861 bgcolor=#fefefe
| 98861 ||  || — || January 7, 2001 || Socorro || LINEAR || — || align=right | 6.0 km || 
|-id=862 bgcolor=#E9E9E9
| 98862 ||  || — || January 15, 2001 || Oizumi || T. Kobayashi || — || align=right | 2.4 km || 
|-id=863 bgcolor=#fefefe
| 98863 ||  || — || January 15, 2001 || Socorro || LINEAR || PHO || align=right | 4.6 km || 
|-id=864 bgcolor=#E9E9E9
| 98864 ||  || — || January 15, 2001 || Socorro || LINEAR || — || align=right | 4.5 km || 
|-id=865 bgcolor=#E9E9E9
| 98865 ||  || — || January 15, 2001 || Socorro || LINEAR || — || align=right | 3.9 km || 
|-id=866 bgcolor=#fefefe
| 98866 Giannabussolari ||  ||  || January 15, 2001 || Cima Ekar || ADAS || V || align=right | 1.7 km || 
|-id=867 bgcolor=#E9E9E9
| 98867 ||  || — || January 18, 2001 || Socorro || LINEAR || — || align=right | 5.0 km || 
|-id=868 bgcolor=#E9E9E9
| 98868 ||  || — || January 18, 2001 || Socorro || LINEAR || — || align=right | 5.4 km || 
|-id=869 bgcolor=#E9E9E9
| 98869 ||  || — || January 18, 2001 || Socorro || LINEAR || — || align=right | 2.7 km || 
|-id=870 bgcolor=#E9E9E9
| 98870 ||  || — || January 18, 2001 || Socorro || LINEAR || EUN || align=right | 2.8 km || 
|-id=871 bgcolor=#E9E9E9
| 98871 ||  || — || January 19, 2001 || Socorro || LINEAR || — || align=right | 2.2 km || 
|-id=872 bgcolor=#E9E9E9
| 98872 ||  || — || January 19, 2001 || Socorro || LINEAR || — || align=right | 2.2 km || 
|-id=873 bgcolor=#fefefe
| 98873 ||  || — || January 20, 2001 || Gnosca || S. Sposetti || — || align=right | 1.9 km || 
|-id=874 bgcolor=#d6d6d6
| 98874 ||  || — || January 19, 2001 || Kitt Peak || Spacewatch || — || align=right | 4.8 km || 
|-id=875 bgcolor=#E9E9E9
| 98875 ||  || — || January 21, 2001 || Oizumi || T. Kobayashi || — || align=right | 4.0 km || 
|-id=876 bgcolor=#fefefe
| 98876 ||  || — || January 19, 2001 || Socorro || LINEAR || — || align=right | 2.0 km || 
|-id=877 bgcolor=#E9E9E9
| 98877 ||  || — || January 19, 2001 || Socorro || LINEAR || — || align=right | 2.5 km || 
|-id=878 bgcolor=#d6d6d6
| 98878 ||  || — || January 20, 2001 || Socorro || LINEAR || KOR || align=right | 3.5 km || 
|-id=879 bgcolor=#E9E9E9
| 98879 ||  || — || January 20, 2001 || Socorro || LINEAR || — || align=right | 4.7 km || 
|-id=880 bgcolor=#fefefe
| 98880 ||  || — || January 20, 2001 || Socorro || LINEAR || — || align=right | 1.7 km || 
|-id=881 bgcolor=#E9E9E9
| 98881 ||  || — || January 20, 2001 || Socorro || LINEAR || — || align=right | 4.1 km || 
|-id=882 bgcolor=#d6d6d6
| 98882 ||  || — || January 20, 2001 || Socorro || LINEAR || — || align=right | 5.4 km || 
|-id=883 bgcolor=#E9E9E9
| 98883 ||  || — || January 20, 2001 || Socorro || LINEAR || — || align=right | 3.8 km || 
|-id=884 bgcolor=#E9E9E9
| 98884 ||  || — || January 20, 2001 || Socorro || LINEAR || — || align=right | 3.9 km || 
|-id=885 bgcolor=#d6d6d6
| 98885 ||  || — || January 20, 2001 || Socorro || LINEAR || KOR || align=right | 3.2 km || 
|-id=886 bgcolor=#fefefe
| 98886 ||  || — || January 20, 2001 || Socorro || LINEAR || — || align=right | 2.7 km || 
|-id=887 bgcolor=#E9E9E9
| 98887 ||  || — || January 20, 2001 || Socorro || LINEAR || — || align=right | 3.0 km || 
|-id=888 bgcolor=#E9E9E9
| 98888 ||  || — || January 20, 2001 || Socorro || LINEAR || — || align=right | 1.8 km || 
|-id=889 bgcolor=#FA8072
| 98889 ||  || — || January 18, 2001 || Socorro || LINEAR || — || align=right | 3.7 km || 
|-id=890 bgcolor=#E9E9E9
| 98890 ||  || — || January 18, 2001 || Socorro || LINEAR || — || align=right | 3.2 km || 
|-id=891 bgcolor=#FA8072
| 98891 ||  || — || January 19, 2001 || Kitt Peak || Spacewatch || — || align=right | 2.2 km || 
|-id=892 bgcolor=#E9E9E9
| 98892 ||  || — || January 19, 2001 || Socorro || LINEAR || — || align=right | 2.7 km || 
|-id=893 bgcolor=#E9E9E9
| 98893 ||  || — || January 19, 2001 || Socorro || LINEAR || — || align=right | 2.4 km || 
|-id=894 bgcolor=#E9E9E9
| 98894 ||  || — || January 19, 2001 || Socorro || LINEAR || — || align=right | 2.2 km || 
|-id=895 bgcolor=#E9E9E9
| 98895 ||  || — || January 19, 2001 || Socorro || LINEAR || — || align=right | 2.4 km || 
|-id=896 bgcolor=#E9E9E9
| 98896 ||  || — || January 19, 2001 || Socorro || LINEAR || GER || align=right | 3.1 km || 
|-id=897 bgcolor=#E9E9E9
| 98897 ||  || — || January 19, 2001 || Socorro || LINEAR || — || align=right | 7.3 km || 
|-id=898 bgcolor=#d6d6d6
| 98898 ||  || — || January 21, 2001 || Socorro || LINEAR || — || align=right | 5.1 km || 
|-id=899 bgcolor=#E9E9E9
| 98899 ||  || — || January 21, 2001 || Socorro || LINEAR || — || align=right | 2.5 km || 
|-id=900 bgcolor=#E9E9E9
| 98900 ||  || — || January 21, 2001 || Socorro || LINEAR || EUN || align=right | 3.6 km || 
|}

98901–99000 

|-bgcolor=#E9E9E9
| 98901 ||  || — || January 28, 2001 || Oizumi || T. Kobayashi || HNS || align=right | 2.5 km || 
|-id=902 bgcolor=#E9E9E9
| 98902 ||  || — || January 17, 2001 || Haleakala || NEAT || EUN || align=right | 2.9 km || 
|-id=903 bgcolor=#E9E9E9
| 98903 ||  || — || January 19, 2001 || Kitt Peak || Spacewatch || — || align=right | 2.1 km || 
|-id=904 bgcolor=#E9E9E9
| 98904 ||  || — || January 19, 2001 || Haleakala || NEAT || — || align=right | 5.6 km || 
|-id=905 bgcolor=#E9E9E9
| 98905 ||  || — || January 21, 2001 || Socorro || LINEAR || — || align=right | 2.3 km || 
|-id=906 bgcolor=#E9E9E9
| 98906 ||  || — || January 21, 2001 || Socorro || LINEAR || — || align=right | 2.2 km || 
|-id=907 bgcolor=#E9E9E9
| 98907 ||  || — || January 26, 2001 || Socorro || LINEAR || EUN || align=right | 6.0 km || 
|-id=908 bgcolor=#E9E9E9
| 98908 ||  || — || January 26, 2001 || Socorro || LINEAR || — || align=right | 2.4 km || 
|-id=909 bgcolor=#E9E9E9
| 98909 ||  || — || January 21, 2001 || Socorro || LINEAR || BRG || align=right | 3.1 km || 
|-id=910 bgcolor=#E9E9E9
| 98910 ||  || — || January 26, 2001 || Socorro || LINEAR || — || align=right | 1.9 km || 
|-id=911 bgcolor=#E9E9E9
| 98911 ||  || — || January 29, 2001 || Socorro || LINEAR || — || align=right | 2.4 km || 
|-id=912 bgcolor=#fefefe
| 98912 ||  || — || January 29, 2001 || Socorro || LINEAR || — || align=right | 2.3 km || 
|-id=913 bgcolor=#E9E9E9
| 98913 ||  || — || January 26, 2001 || Socorro || LINEAR || — || align=right | 3.6 km || 
|-id=914 bgcolor=#E9E9E9
| 98914 ||  || — || January 26, 2001 || Socorro || LINEAR || — || align=right | 2.4 km || 
|-id=915 bgcolor=#E9E9E9
| 98915 ||  || — || January 30, 2001 || Socorro || LINEAR || — || align=right | 3.8 km || 
|-id=916 bgcolor=#E9E9E9
| 98916 ||  || — || January 31, 2001 || Socorro || LINEAR || MAR || align=right | 5.2 km || 
|-id=917 bgcolor=#E9E9E9
| 98917 ||  || — || January 29, 2001 || Socorro || LINEAR || — || align=right | 1.7 km || 
|-id=918 bgcolor=#E9E9E9
| 98918 ||  || — || January 31, 2001 || Socorro || LINEAR || — || align=right | 4.7 km || 
|-id=919 bgcolor=#E9E9E9
| 98919 ||  || — || January 31, 2001 || Socorro || LINEAR || — || align=right | 3.2 km || 
|-id=920 bgcolor=#E9E9E9
| 98920 ||  || — || January 31, 2001 || Socorro || LINEAR || — || align=right | 4.0 km || 
|-id=921 bgcolor=#d6d6d6
| 98921 ||  || — || January 26, 2001 || Socorro || LINEAR || — || align=right | 5.7 km || 
|-id=922 bgcolor=#E9E9E9
| 98922 ||  || — || January 26, 2001 || Socorro || LINEAR || — || align=right | 3.6 km || 
|-id=923 bgcolor=#d6d6d6
| 98923 ||  || — || January 25, 2001 || Haleakala || NEAT || — || align=right | 6.6 km || 
|-id=924 bgcolor=#E9E9E9
| 98924 ||  || — || January 18, 2001 || Socorro || LINEAR || MAR || align=right | 2.5 km || 
|-id=925 bgcolor=#fefefe
| 98925 || 2001 CX || — || February 1, 2001 || Socorro || LINEAR || NYS || align=right | 3.8 km || 
|-id=926 bgcolor=#E9E9E9
| 98926 ||  || — || February 1, 2001 || Socorro || LINEAR || — || align=right | 2.9 km || 
|-id=927 bgcolor=#E9E9E9
| 98927 ||  || — || February 1, 2001 || Socorro || LINEAR || — || align=right | 6.0 km || 
|-id=928 bgcolor=#E9E9E9
| 98928 ||  || — || February 1, 2001 || Socorro || LINEAR || — || align=right | 2.3 km || 
|-id=929 bgcolor=#E9E9E9
| 98929 ||  || — || February 1, 2001 || Socorro || LINEAR || — || align=right | 1.8 km || 
|-id=930 bgcolor=#E9E9E9
| 98930 ||  || — || February 1, 2001 || Socorro || LINEAR || EUN || align=right | 2.9 km || 
|-id=931 bgcolor=#E9E9E9
| 98931 ||  || — || February 1, 2001 || Socorro || LINEAR || JUN || align=right | 2.2 km || 
|-id=932 bgcolor=#E9E9E9
| 98932 ||  || — || February 1, 2001 || Socorro || LINEAR || — || align=right | 2.4 km || 
|-id=933 bgcolor=#E9E9E9
| 98933 ||  || — || February 1, 2001 || Socorro || LINEAR || — || align=right | 4.4 km || 
|-id=934 bgcolor=#E9E9E9
| 98934 ||  || — || February 1, 2001 || Socorro || LINEAR || — || align=right | 1.7 km || 
|-id=935 bgcolor=#d6d6d6
| 98935 ||  || — || February 1, 2001 || Socorro || LINEAR || — || align=right | 13 km || 
|-id=936 bgcolor=#E9E9E9
| 98936 ||  || — || February 1, 2001 || Socorro || LINEAR || — || align=right | 4.9 km || 
|-id=937 bgcolor=#fefefe
| 98937 ||  || — || February 1, 2001 || Socorro || LINEAR || NYS || align=right | 4.5 km || 
|-id=938 bgcolor=#E9E9E9
| 98938 ||  || — || February 1, 2001 || Socorro || LINEAR || — || align=right | 4.8 km || 
|-id=939 bgcolor=#E9E9E9
| 98939 ||  || — || February 1, 2001 || Socorro || LINEAR || — || align=right | 3.4 km || 
|-id=940 bgcolor=#fefefe
| 98940 ||  || — || February 2, 2001 || Socorro || LINEAR || — || align=right | 2.3 km || 
|-id=941 bgcolor=#E9E9E9
| 98941 ||  || — || February 3, 2001 || Socorro || LINEAR || — || align=right | 3.6 km || 
|-id=942 bgcolor=#E9E9E9
| 98942 ||  || — || February 3, 2001 || Socorro || LINEAR || — || align=right | 6.5 km || 
|-id=943 bgcolor=#FFC2E0
| 98943 ||  || — || February 3, 2001 || Socorro || LINEAR || APO || align=right data-sort-value="0.73" | 730 m || 
|-id=944 bgcolor=#E9E9E9
| 98944 ||  || — || February 1, 2001 || Anderson Mesa || LONEOS || — || align=right | 2.8 km || 
|-id=945 bgcolor=#E9E9E9
| 98945 ||  || — || February 1, 2001 || Anderson Mesa || LONEOS || — || align=right | 3.7 km || 
|-id=946 bgcolor=#E9E9E9
| 98946 ||  || — || February 1, 2001 || Anderson Mesa || LONEOS || HEN || align=right | 2.7 km || 
|-id=947 bgcolor=#fefefe
| 98947 ||  || — || February 1, 2001 || Anderson Mesa || LONEOS || — || align=right | 4.9 km || 
|-id=948 bgcolor=#E9E9E9
| 98948 ||  || — || February 1, 2001 || Anderson Mesa || LONEOS || — || align=right | 3.0 km || 
|-id=949 bgcolor=#E9E9E9
| 98949 ||  || — || February 2, 2001 || Anderson Mesa || LONEOS || GEF || align=right | 6.9 km || 
|-id=950 bgcolor=#E9E9E9
| 98950 ||  || — || February 2, 2001 || Anderson Mesa || LONEOS || — || align=right | 6.6 km || 
|-id=951 bgcolor=#E9E9E9
| 98951 ||  || — || February 2, 2001 || Anderson Mesa || LONEOS || — || align=right | 6.8 km || 
|-id=952 bgcolor=#d6d6d6
| 98952 ||  || — || February 2, 2001 || Anderson Mesa || LONEOS || — || align=right | 8.9 km || 
|-id=953 bgcolor=#d6d6d6
| 98953 ||  || — || February 2, 2001 || Anderson Mesa || LONEOS || NAE || align=right | 7.8 km || 
|-id=954 bgcolor=#E9E9E9
| 98954 ||  || — || February 12, 2001 || Črni Vrh || Črni Vrh || — || align=right | 2.8 km || 
|-id=955 bgcolor=#d6d6d6
| 98955 ||  || — || February 13, 2001 || Socorro || LINEAR || EUP || align=right | 10 km || 
|-id=956 bgcolor=#d6d6d6
| 98956 ||  || — || February 13, 2001 || Socorro || LINEAR || — || align=right | 5.4 km || 
|-id=957 bgcolor=#E9E9E9
| 98957 ||  || — || February 15, 2001 || Oizumi || T. Kobayashi || — || align=right | 4.1 km || 
|-id=958 bgcolor=#d6d6d6
| 98958 ||  || — || February 15, 2001 || Socorro || LINEAR || ALA || align=right | 9.4 km || 
|-id=959 bgcolor=#E9E9E9
| 98959 ||  || — || February 13, 2001 || Socorro || LINEAR || EUN || align=right | 2.4 km || 
|-id=960 bgcolor=#d6d6d6
| 98960 ||  || — || February 15, 2001 || Socorro || LINEAR || INA || align=right | 9.6 km || 
|-id=961 bgcolor=#E9E9E9
| 98961 ||  || — || February 15, 2001 || Socorro || LINEAR || — || align=right | 7.0 km || 
|-id=962 bgcolor=#E9E9E9
| 98962 ||  || — || February 15, 2001 || Socorro || LINEAR || — || align=right | 5.2 km || 
|-id=963 bgcolor=#d6d6d6
| 98963 ||  || — || February 15, 2001 || Socorro || LINEAR || ALA || align=right | 7.0 km || 
|-id=964 bgcolor=#E9E9E9
| 98964 ||  || — || February 15, 2001 || Socorro || LINEAR || — || align=right | 2.6 km || 
|-id=965 bgcolor=#E9E9E9
| 98965 ||  || — || February 15, 2001 || Socorro || LINEAR || — || align=right | 2.7 km || 
|-id=966 bgcolor=#E9E9E9
| 98966 ||  || — || February 12, 2001 || Anderson Mesa || LONEOS || — || align=right | 2.3 km || 
|-id=967 bgcolor=#d6d6d6
| 98967 ||  || — || February 16, 2001 || Prescott || P. G. Comba || THM || align=right | 7.5 km || 
|-id=968 bgcolor=#E9E9E9
| 98968 ||  || — || February 16, 2001 || Socorro || LINEAR || — || align=right | 3.0 km || 
|-id=969 bgcolor=#E9E9E9
| 98969 ||  || — || February 17, 2001 || Socorro || LINEAR || — || align=right | 2.3 km || 
|-id=970 bgcolor=#d6d6d6
| 98970 ||  || — || February 17, 2001 || Socorro || LINEAR || — || align=right | 5.9 km || 
|-id=971 bgcolor=#E9E9E9
| 98971 ||  || — || February 17, 2001 || Socorro || LINEAR || — || align=right | 2.6 km || 
|-id=972 bgcolor=#E9E9E9
| 98972 ||  || — || February 20, 2001 || Oaxaca || J. M. Roe || AGN || align=right | 2.8 km || 
|-id=973 bgcolor=#E9E9E9
| 98973 ||  || — || February 17, 2001 || Črni Vrh || Črni Vrh || — || align=right | 1.9 km || 
|-id=974 bgcolor=#fefefe
| 98974 ||  || — || February 16, 2001 || Socorro || LINEAR || — || align=right | 2.1 km || 
|-id=975 bgcolor=#E9E9E9
| 98975 ||  || — || February 16, 2001 || Socorro || LINEAR || — || align=right | 2.4 km || 
|-id=976 bgcolor=#d6d6d6
| 98976 ||  || — || February 16, 2001 || Socorro || LINEAR || — || align=right | 4.5 km || 
|-id=977 bgcolor=#d6d6d6
| 98977 ||  || — || February 16, 2001 || Socorro || LINEAR || — || align=right | 6.3 km || 
|-id=978 bgcolor=#E9E9E9
| 98978 ||  || — || February 16, 2001 || Socorro || LINEAR || GEF || align=right | 3.7 km || 
|-id=979 bgcolor=#E9E9E9
| 98979 ||  || — || February 16, 2001 || Socorro || LINEAR || — || align=right | 2.4 km || 
|-id=980 bgcolor=#d6d6d6
| 98980 ||  || — || February 16, 2001 || Socorro || LINEAR || — || align=right | 4.3 km || 
|-id=981 bgcolor=#E9E9E9
| 98981 ||  || — || February 16, 2001 || Socorro || LINEAR || — || align=right | 5.1 km || 
|-id=982 bgcolor=#d6d6d6
| 98982 ||  || — || February 17, 2001 || Socorro || LINEAR || — || align=right | 3.4 km || 
|-id=983 bgcolor=#E9E9E9
| 98983 ||  || — || February 17, 2001 || Socorro || LINEAR || — || align=right | 3.3 km || 
|-id=984 bgcolor=#d6d6d6
| 98984 ||  || — || February 17, 2001 || Socorro || LINEAR || URS || align=right | 7.1 km || 
|-id=985 bgcolor=#E9E9E9
| 98985 ||  || — || February 17, 2001 || Socorro || LINEAR || — || align=right | 2.0 km || 
|-id=986 bgcolor=#E9E9E9
| 98986 ||  || — || February 17, 2001 || Socorro || LINEAR || — || align=right | 1.9 km || 
|-id=987 bgcolor=#E9E9E9
| 98987 ||  || — || February 17, 2001 || Socorro || LINEAR || — || align=right | 4.3 km || 
|-id=988 bgcolor=#d6d6d6
| 98988 ||  || — || February 17, 2001 || Socorro || LINEAR || 7:4 || align=right | 6.4 km || 
|-id=989 bgcolor=#E9E9E9
| 98989 ||  || — || February 17, 2001 || Socorro || LINEAR || — || align=right | 2.4 km || 
|-id=990 bgcolor=#E9E9E9
| 98990 ||  || — || February 17, 2001 || Socorro || LINEAR || — || align=right | 2.8 km || 
|-id=991 bgcolor=#d6d6d6
| 98991 ||  || — || February 19, 2001 || Socorro || LINEAR || KOR || align=right | 2.8 km || 
|-id=992 bgcolor=#E9E9E9
| 98992 ||  || — || February 19, 2001 || Socorro || LINEAR || — || align=right | 1.8 km || 
|-id=993 bgcolor=#E9E9E9
| 98993 ||  || — || February 19, 2001 || Socorro || LINEAR || PAD || align=right | 4.1 km || 
|-id=994 bgcolor=#E9E9E9
| 98994 ||  || — || February 19, 2001 || Socorro || LINEAR || — || align=right | 3.3 km || 
|-id=995 bgcolor=#E9E9E9
| 98995 ||  || — || February 19, 2001 || Socorro || LINEAR || — || align=right | 4.6 km || 
|-id=996 bgcolor=#E9E9E9
| 98996 ||  || — || February 19, 2001 || Socorro || LINEAR || — || align=right | 5.4 km || 
|-id=997 bgcolor=#E9E9E9
| 98997 ||  || — || February 19, 2001 || Socorro || LINEAR || — || align=right | 3.1 km || 
|-id=998 bgcolor=#E9E9E9
| 98998 ||  || — || February 19, 2001 || Socorro || LINEAR || — || align=right | 2.1 km || 
|-id=999 bgcolor=#E9E9E9
| 98999 ||  || — || February 16, 2001 || Socorro || LINEAR || — || align=right | 2.2 km || 
|-id=000 bgcolor=#d6d6d6
| 99000 ||  || — || February 16, 2001 || Socorro || LINEAR || EOS || align=right | 4.2 km || 
|}

References

External links 
 Discovery Circumstances: Numbered Minor Planets (95001)–(100000) (IAU Minor Planet Center)

0098